= Vala (Blake) =

Character in the mythological writings of William Blake

In the mythological writings of William Blake, Vala is an Emanation and the mate of Luvah, one of the four Zoas, who were created when Albion, the primordial man, was divided fourfold. She represents nature while Luvah represents emotions. Originally with Luvah, she joins with Albion and begets the Zoa Urizen. In her fallen aspect, she is the wandering figure known as the Shadowy Female. After the Final Judgment, she is reunited with Luvah but placed under the dominion of the restored Urizen.

== Character ==
Vala represents Nature and is an Emanation of the Zoa Luvah. Through him, she is connected to the East. Her name is derived from Voluspa, which is an earth spirit from the Edda. Luvah is connected to the heart aspect of the body and Vala is what the heart loves, which is nature and vegetative based creation. Sometimes she is connected to the image of the Old Woman within Blake's Orc cycle. As such, she is related to Rahab and Enitharmon.

In the beginning, Vala joined with Albion, the Eternal Man, and he impregnated her with Urizen, the first created form. In that act, Vala was split from Luvah and Albion became fallen. Immediately after, she hid because of her disconnection with Luvah. In response, Luvah attacked Albion by giving him boils and removed Albion's ability to sense. This leads to Luvah's fall. Once fallen, he steals Urizen's chariot, and the two ride the chariot across the sky. However, this leads to the two being divided, as Luvah recognizes that Vala is become more material, and Urizen pits them against each other. This leads to Luvah's imprisonment within a furnace and his being melted down by Vala, turned into a fire, to form the material universe. During these events, Urizen causes both Los and Enitharmon to fall and be separated by offering them the ability to judge and condemn Vala and Luvah.

She is recreated within Enitharmon's heart and becomes the material being known as the Shadowy Female. When she meets with Tharmas in this form, he tells her that she and her sinning caused the fall of the others. She tries to convince Urizen to restore Luvah, and is left to melancholy. He uses her to destroy Jesus who took upon the mantel of Luvah. After realizing that it was Jesus, Vala and confronts him over the matter. Urizen, in turn, becomes the Dragon found in the Book of Revelation. During the Final Judgment, Urizen lets go over his feud with Vala and Luvah, which restores him to his former glory. After Albion is regenerated, Luvah and Vala are made servants of the restored Urizen.

Albion and Vala are deeply connected in Blake's myth. Originally, Albion was also with Jerusalem, but he abandons her after she claims that both Vala and Albion are too obsessed with the idea of sin. Jerusalem's fall provokes Vala to claim that she is the triumphant beauty and embraces materialism along with statements that women are dominant. Los rejects these claims and defends mankind. Although she has entered into a fallen state, from her line Jesus would be born. In the fallen state, she promotes revenge, jealousy and justice during war. When she is redeemed after the Final Judgment, she is joined with Albion as his bride. This allows for a union between mankind and the divine.

== Appearances ==
Vala originates in the uncompleted Vala, or The Four Zoas, which was originally named after her. As a secondary figure in the work, she is responsible for Albion's fall. However, she is alluded to in the early America a Prophecy in her relationship with Orc. In Blake's Jerusalem: The Emanation of the Giant Albion, she is transformed into a binary with Jerusalem with her representing nature and Jerusalem representing freedom. Together, they are two wives of Albion, and they originally formed one whole known as Britannia. Jerusalem is Albion's Emanation, and she is made into the wife of Jesus with Vala being Albion's.
