= Ahania =

Emanation, or female counterpart, of Urizen

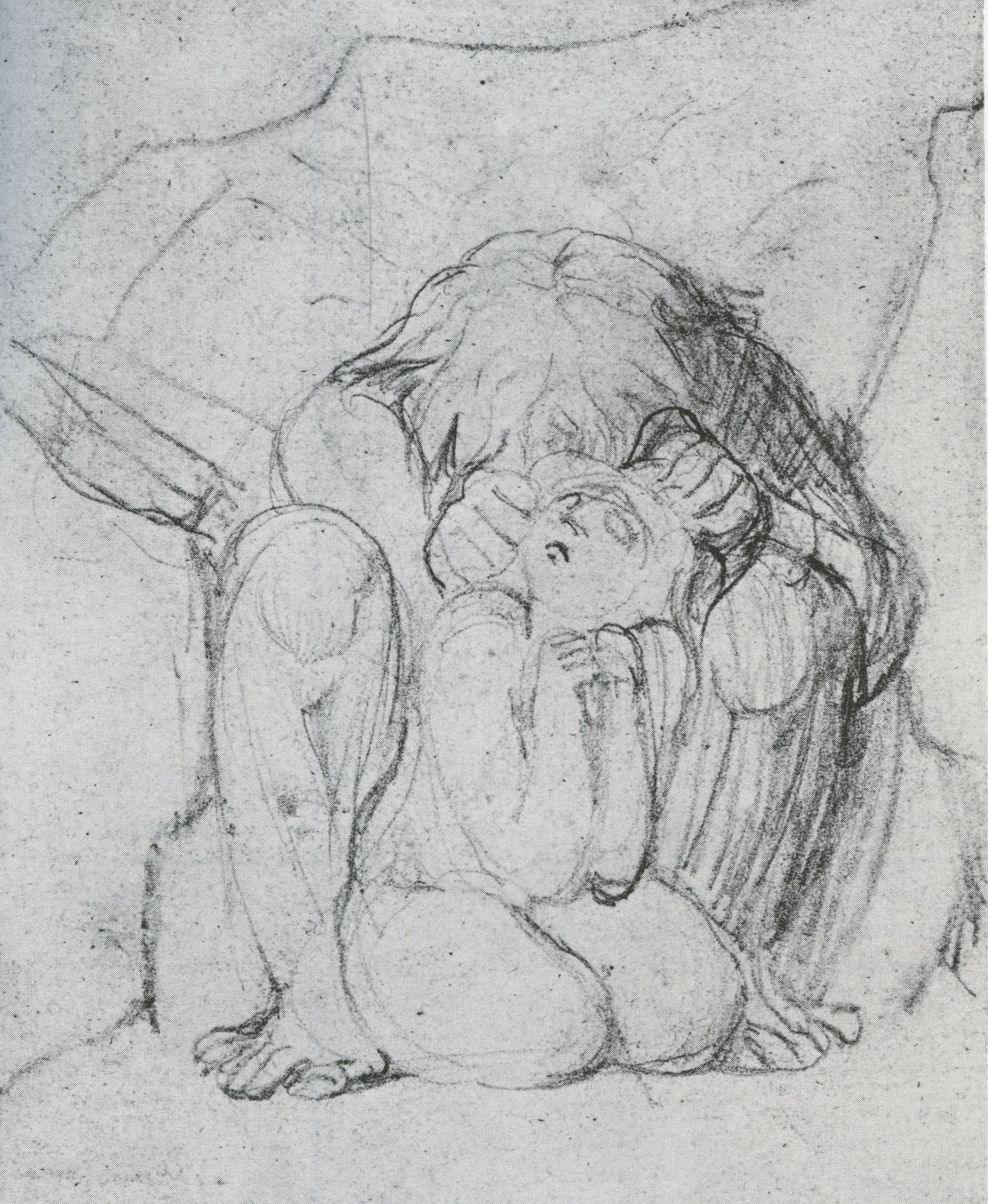
Urizen destroying Ahania; pencil study by Blake for The Book of Ahania.

Ahania is the Emanation, or female counterpart, of Urizen, Zoas of reason, in William Blake's mythology. She is the representation of pleasure and the desire for intelligence. Although Urizen casts her out as being the manifestation of sin, she is actually an essential component in Blake's system to achieving Divine Wisdom. She is a figure of the goddess of wisdom. It is through her that the sons and daughters of Urizen are born. In the original myth, her son Fuzon rebels against his father and is responsible for separating Urizen and Ahania. In his later version, Ahania is separated from Urizen after he believes that she is sinful.

== Character ==
Ahania represents pleasure and is connected to the Zoas Urizen, who represents reason. They are divided because Urizen is unable to understand the necessity of pleasure for the mind. In Blake's early myth, Ahania and Urizen are united until their son Fuzon separates the two by cutting his father's loins apart. She is labelled as Sin by Urizen and hidden away with her only capable of lamenting her fate. Ahania is the representation of a wisdom goddess, as she is an emanation of Urizen, who is connected to the head.

In Blake's later myth, she provides Urizen with twelve sons and three daughters, which represent the Zodiac and the three parts of the body. However, Urizen believes that Ahania has too much influence and denies her the ability to come to the marriage of Los and Enitharmon. In return, she becomes cold and distant. Eventually, Los and Enitharmon bring Ahania to hear Enion's wailing. After Enion reveals the fallen world to Ahania, she represents intellectual desire and has a sexual element. Although she is cast off as being sinful, she is necessary for Divine Wisdom and is essential for any act of creation. Urizen tells her that he is afraid that Orc, the one that would overthrow him, would be born, and Ahania describes her vision of a dark future. Urizen, upset, separates from her because she is not obedient enough for him. In despair, she enters the Caverns of the Grave. She returns on the Last Judgment when Urizen stops trying to control everything. This action allows Urizen to regain his previous form. In the feast after the Final Judgment, she is reunited with Urizen.

== Appearances ==
Ahania is described in The Book of Ahania (1795), which gives her origins. She was originally part of Urizen until her son, Fuzon, rebelled against Urizen and cut apart his loins. This established her as a separate entity, and Urizen named her Sin. The work ends with Fuzon's death by the hands of Urizen. Eventually, this version was overwritten in Vala, or The Four Zoas. The later version describes her more as his shadow counterpart and as the mother of their many children. Urizen is a jealous lover, which causes her to despair. Eventually, she is separated from Urizen when she hears Enion's lament. Ahania appears in Milton a Poem, and she is described as lamenting after she is cast out. In Jerusalem The Emanation of the Giant Albion, Ahania is described as a shade when Los is able to see the four Emanations.

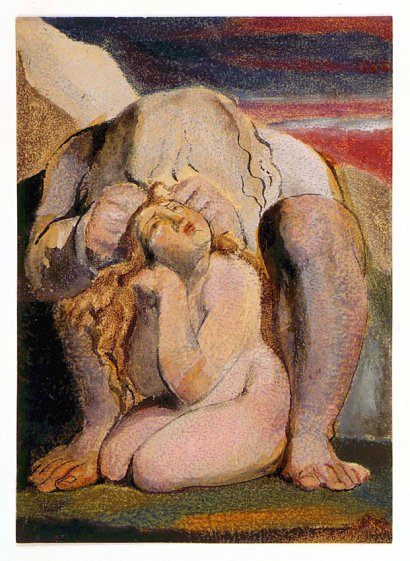
image from The Book of Ahania
