= William Blake's illustrations of Paradise Lost =

Illustrations by William Blake

William Blake illustrated Paradise Lost more often than any other work by John Milton, and illustrated Milton's work more often than that of any other writer. While he was not the first to illustrate the epic poem, he is considered by many to be the most prevalent. The illustrations demonstrate his critical engagement with the text, specifically his efforts to redeem the "errors" he perceived in his predecessor's work.

== William Blake & John Milton ==
William Blake highly revered John Milton and his works. Blake felt a personal connection to the author, as he detailed in his own writings. Also an author, he wrote various pieces about Milton and Paradise Lost, and Milton largely influenced his writing style and visual creative work. Blake also painted portraits of Milton himself, and it is theorized that some of his depictions of characters from Paradise Lost are also symbolically representative of Milton. Milton was highly admired in Blake's time, and while Blake did admire him, he did not shy away from criticizing him through his work, as well.

== Description and provenance ==
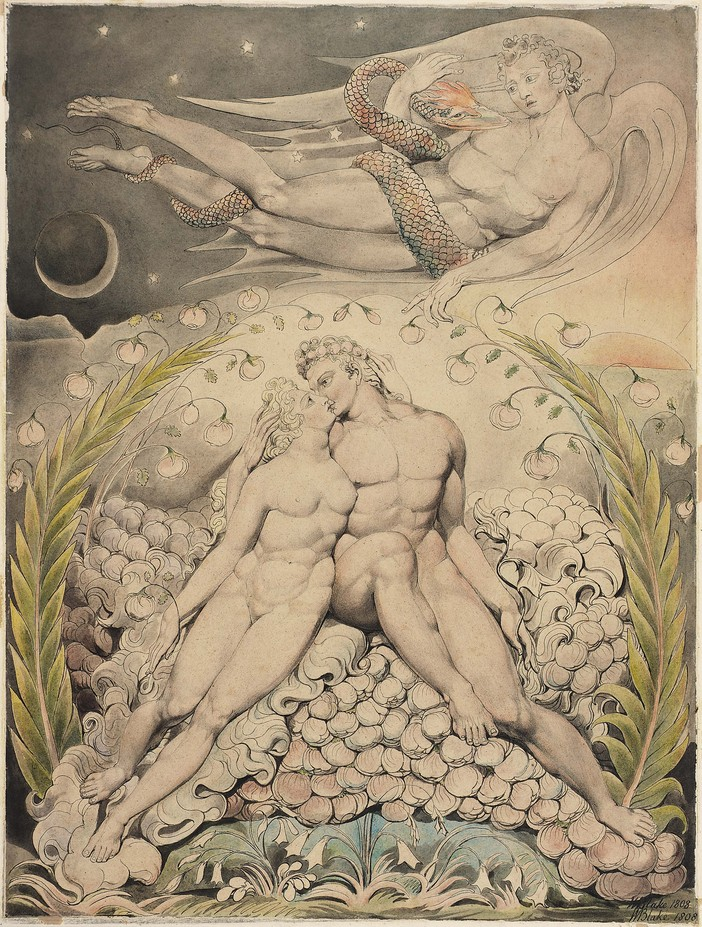
Satan Watching the Endearments of Adam and Eve (1808), version from the "Butts set"

The Thomas set

The paintings of the Thomas set are each approximately 10 x 8.25 inches. They were commissioned by the Reverend Joseph Thomas at an unrecorded date, sometime before 1807. Although the sheets were trimmed at some time, which removed or concealed the date from several, some still retain the date of 1807, establishing the year of their completion. Thomas's grandson inherited them from his father and sold them at Sotheby's in 1872. By 1876 they were in the collection of Alfred Aspland, who by 1885 took them to Sotheby's again, dispersing the set among several buyers. Henry Huntington reunited the works in 1914, and today they are still in the collection of the Huntington Library.

The Butts set

The dimensions of the Butts set, also known as the "large set," are 19.5x15.5 inches, nearly twice that of the Thomas set. Dated 1808, they were commissioned from Blake by his patron Thomas Butts, who also commissioned many paintings on biblical themes from Blake. In the early 1850s, Butts's son Thomas Butts Jr. offered the individual paintings for sale at several auctions, resulting in the dispersal of the set. Today it remains divided between four museums. Nine of the paintings were sold at Messrs. Foster in 1853 to J. C. Strange, passing through several other hands before they were acquired by the Museum of Fine Arts, Boston, their present owner. The other three were sold to one "Fuller" at an unknown date, from whom they passed to H.A.J. Munro. Munro further complicated matters by selling the three paintings to separate buyers at Christie's in 1868. No. 1 was acquired by the Victoria and Albert Museum in 1869, No. 2 by Henry Huntington in 1916, and No. 10 by the Houghton Library in 1966.

The Linnell set

The Linnell set is incomplete – it contains only Satan Watching the Endearments of Adam and Eve, The Creation of Eve and Michael Foretells the Crucifixion. It is thought that the set was never completed by Blake, but that it was also going to consist of twelve paintings like his other sets. The paintings in this set are exactly the same as their corresponding entries in the Butts set in both size and composition, the major difference being their loose handling of the watercolor. The paintings were drawn in pen and painted in watercolor over pencil drawings. Like the Linnell set of William Blake's Illustrations of the Book of Job, these were commissioned by Blake's patron John Linnell, and traced by Linnell from the Butts set. An entry in Linnell's journal dates the commission to 9 May 1822. Currently Satan Watching the Endearments of Adam and Eve and The Creation of Eve are in the collection of the National Gallery of Victoria, and Michael Foretells the Crucifixion is in the collection of the Fitzwilliam Museum.

== Analysis ==
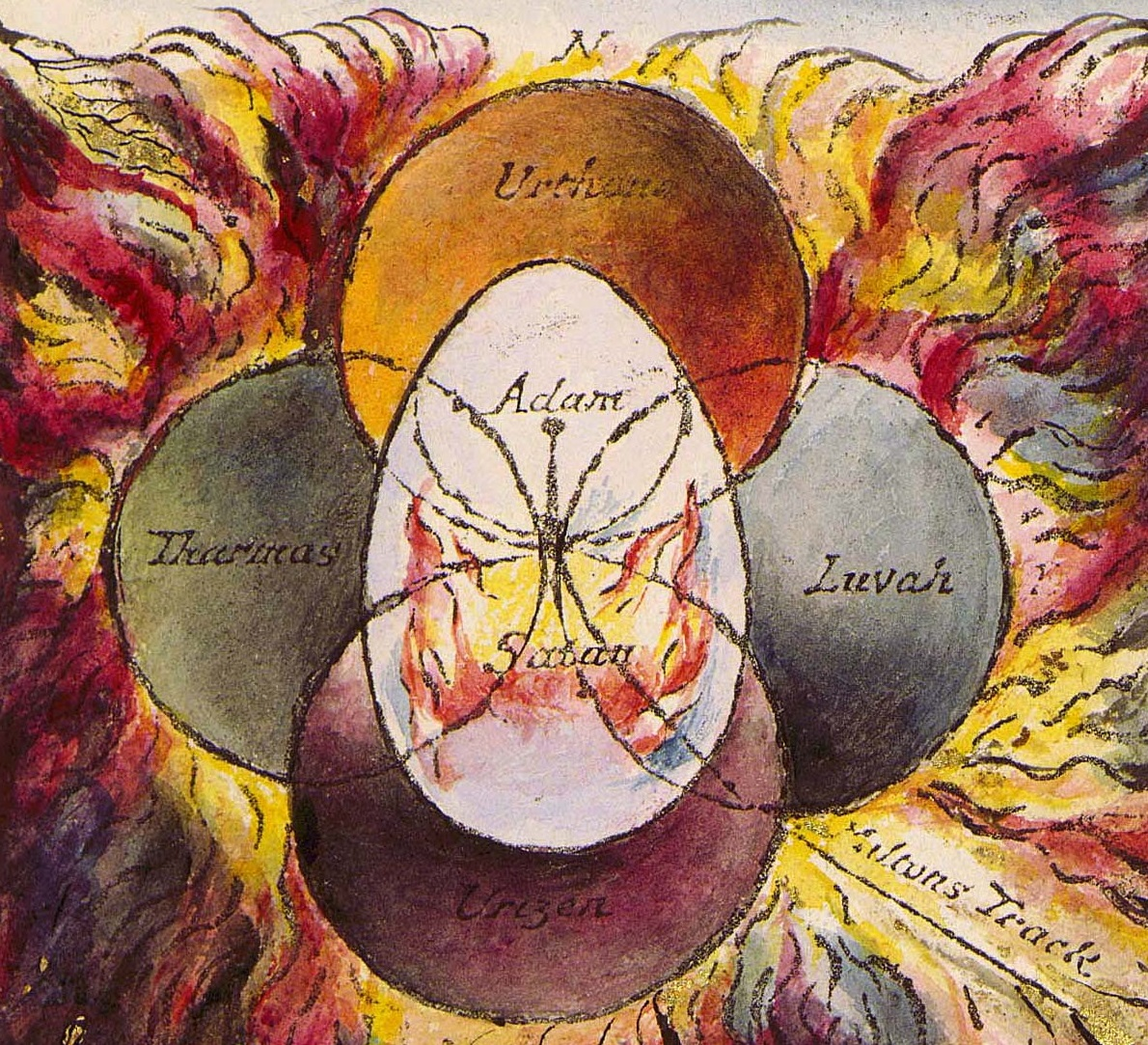
Illustration to Milton a Poem. In Blake's mythology, Adam and Satan are two extremes of the fallen Albion.

There are twelve plates in each of the Paradise Lost sets, one for each of the books in the poem. While some of these, such as Satan, Sin and Death: Satan Comes to the Gates of Hell, depict specific scenes from the epic; others, such as Satan Watching the Endearments of Adam and Eve, are syntheses of several scenes. In the latter case, Blake employed visual barriers to separate the elements from different scenes, such as the arc of the bower in Satan Watching the Endearments of Adam and Eve.

In Blake's mythology, Albion's fall from a divine androgyny to a sexual nature divides him into the Four Zoas, their spectres (representative of hypocritical morality), and their emanations (female halves). In the Paradise Lost illustrations, Adam is analogous to the fallen Albion, Satan to Adam's Spectre, and Eve to Adam's emanation.

== Table of Illustrations ==
Thomas set	Butts set	Linnell set	Title	Related works by Blake	Notes
			Satan Arousing the Rebel Angels		
			Satan, Sin, and Death: Satan Comes to the Gates of Hell		
			Christ offers to Redeem Man		
			Satan Spying on Adam and Eve and Raphael's Descent into Paradise		
			Satan Watching the Endearments of Adam and Eve		
			Adam and Eve Asleep		
			Raphael Warns Adam and Eve		
			The Rout of the Rebel Angels		
			The Creation of Eve		
			The Temptation and Fall of Eve		
			The Judgment of Adam and Eve: "So Judged He Man"		
			Michael Foretells the Crucifixion		
			The Expulsion of Adam and Eve from the Garden of Eden		
