= Enion =

Fictional character created by William Blake

In the mythological writings of William Blake, Enion is an Emanation/mate of Tharmas, one of the four Zoas, who were created when Albion, the primordial man, was divided fourfold. She represents sexuality and sexual urges while Tharmas represents sensation. In her fallen aspect, she is a wailing woman that is filled with jealousy. After the Final Judgment, she is reunited with Tharmas and able to experience an idealised sexual union.

== Character ==
Enion is an Emanation and the female aspect of Tharmas, one of the divine Four Zoas in the mythology of William Blake. Tharmas is the western and water-associated Zoa, connected with the senses and the body, while Enion represents sexual desire. It is possible that her name derives from letters used in Enitharmon's name, with "Tharmas" forming the middle portion and "Enion" the remainder. Tharmas represents unity within the spirit, and when Enion is separated from him, she becomes an image of the Earth Mother. Enion possesses the power to generate the world. She and Tharmas coexist harmoniously until innocence is removed from their relationship. She seeks union with Tharmas but is prevented by the concept of sin. Along with creating nature, she creates the "Circle of Destiny", which removes Tharmas's power of speech by closing the Gate of the Tongue.

After her separation from Tharmas, Enion becomes jealous and attacks other Emanations that proceed from him, despite their being her own children. She separates the free aspects known as Jerusalem from Tharmas's soul and hides from him within the material world, known as Ulro. She also separates from Tharmas his Spectre, a selfish and sexual aspect of his being. From the union of Tharmas and Enion come Los and Enitharmon, who represent Imagination and Poetry. However, Los and Enitharmon flee. Enion becomes enraged and comes to view the world as cruel. Tharmas shelters Enitharmon, but Enion eventually finds and kills her.

Enion is reduced to wailing and singing. Her song has the power to either create madness or to bring about an apocalypse. The actual song describes lost innocence and the nature of pleasure. Enion wanders, separated from Tharmas, despite his repeated attempts to return to her. Albion, the primordial human, relinquishes power as he dies, affected by her lamentation, while Urizen is terrified when he witnesses it. The wailing is later used by both Los and Enitharmon to separate Urizen from his Emanation, Ahania. In human form, Tharmas continues to seek Enion, though he is unable to overcome his hatred of her. Eventually, they reconcile sufficiently for Tharmas to invite her back, but by then Enion has dissolved into little more than a voice of lamentation. During the Final Judgment, Tharmas and Enion are reunited. Enion regains her form and joins the others at Albion's feast.

== Appearances ==
Enion is introduced in Vala, or The Four Zoas as her division from Tharmas begins the work. The work describes their sexual and moral struggles. She is a jealous lover and eventually hides from him. She is depicted as a wailing voice and is the essence of sexuality, jealous, and physical passions. In Milton a Poem, she is described as a wandering, wailing voice. In Jerusalem The Emanation of the Giant Albion, Enion is questioned as being dominant, and the birth of Los and Enitharmon changes. In the new version, Los protests about the action, but he cannot prevent it.
