= Vala, or The Four Zoas =

Uncompleted prophetic book by William Blake

Vala, or The Four Zoas is one of the uncompleted prophetic books by the English poet William Blake, begun in 1797. The eponymous main characters of the book are the Four Zoas (Urthona, Urizen, Luvah and Tharmas), who were created by the fall of Albion in Blake's mythology. It consists of nine books, referred to as "nights". These outline the interactions of the Zoas, their fallen forms and their Emanations. Blake intended the book to be a summation of his mythic universe but, dissatisfied, he abandoned the effort in 1807, leaving the poem in a rough draft and its engraving unfinished. The text of the poem was first published, with only a small portion of the accompanying illustrations, in 1893, by the Irish poet W. B. Yeats and his collaborator, the English writer and poet Edwin John Ellis, in their three-volume book The Works of William Blake.

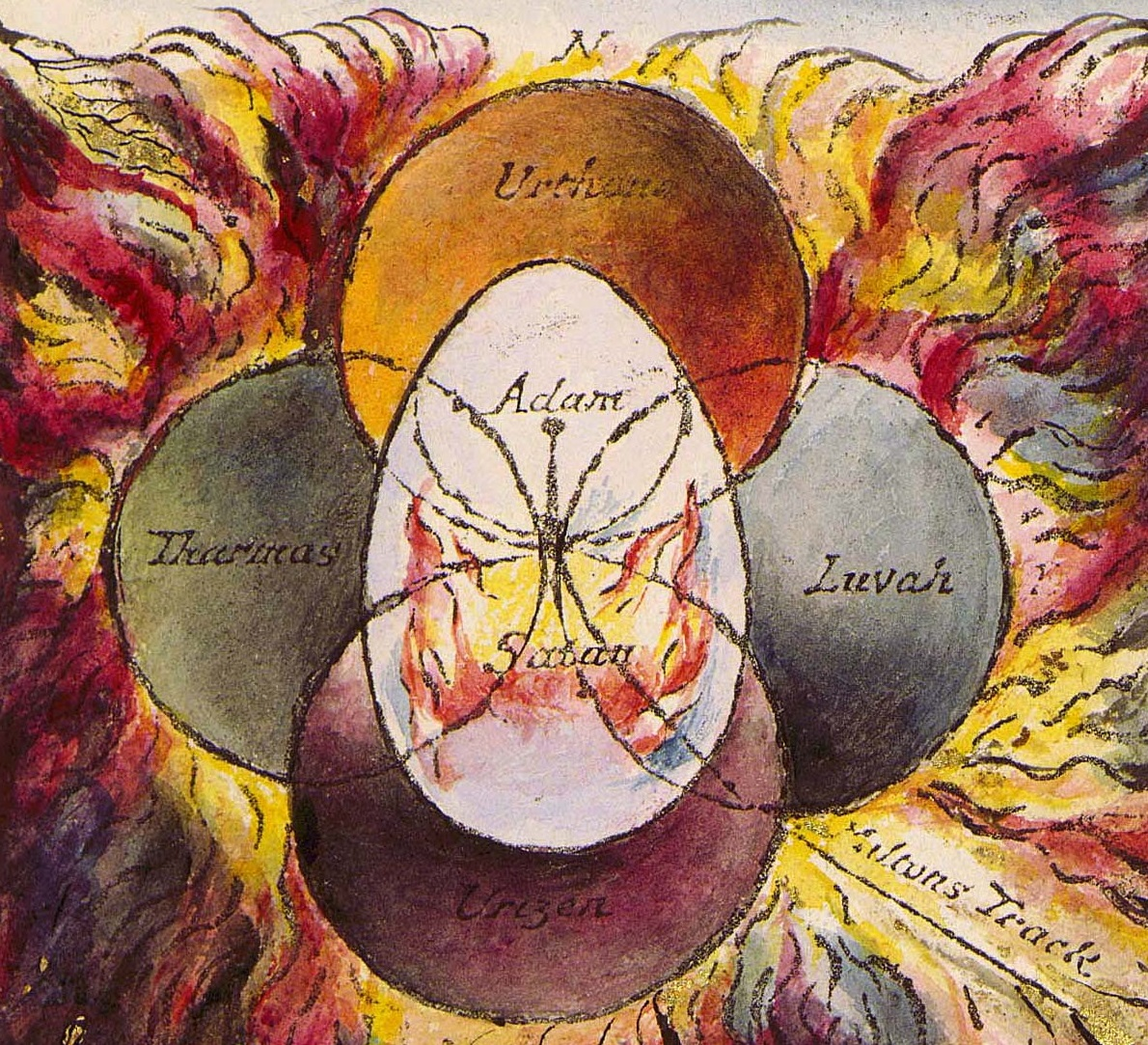
An illustration of the relationship of the four Zoas from one of Blake's other works: Milton a Poem

== Background ==
Blake began working on Vala, or The Death and Judgement of the Eternal Man: A Dream of Nine Nights while he was working on an illustrated edition of Edward Young's Night Thoughts after 1795. He continued to work on it throughout the rest of the 1790s, but he lost confidence that he could complete the work, as he was in a state of deep depression. After 1800, however, he became able to work on it again. The poem was retitled The Four Zoas: The torments of Love & Jealousy in The death and Judgment of Albion the Ancient Man in 1807, and this title is often used to denote a second version of the poem, the first having been completed between 1796 and 1802.

The poem was written on proof engravings of Night Thoughts. The lines are surrounded by large designs, and there are around 2,000 lines in the original version of the poem and 4,000 in the second version. The differences between the two versions are primarily in the last two "nights".

The plates for Vala were much larger than those for any of Blake's previous works. Europe a Prophecy, which is 265 lines long, was printed on copperplates that measured 23 × 17 cm. The plates used to print Vala were 41 × 32 cm. The work also took far longer than any of his previous works had: most of Blake's designs were completed within a year, but Vala took ten years. A notebook was probably used to draft the poem or the designs, but none has survived. One of the manuscript sheets was used to create a history of England that was abandoned by Blake in 1793. The work was never put into etching, and the manuscript was given to John Linnell. Portions of the work were later used in Blake's Jerusalem The Emanation of the Giant Albion.

== Poem ==
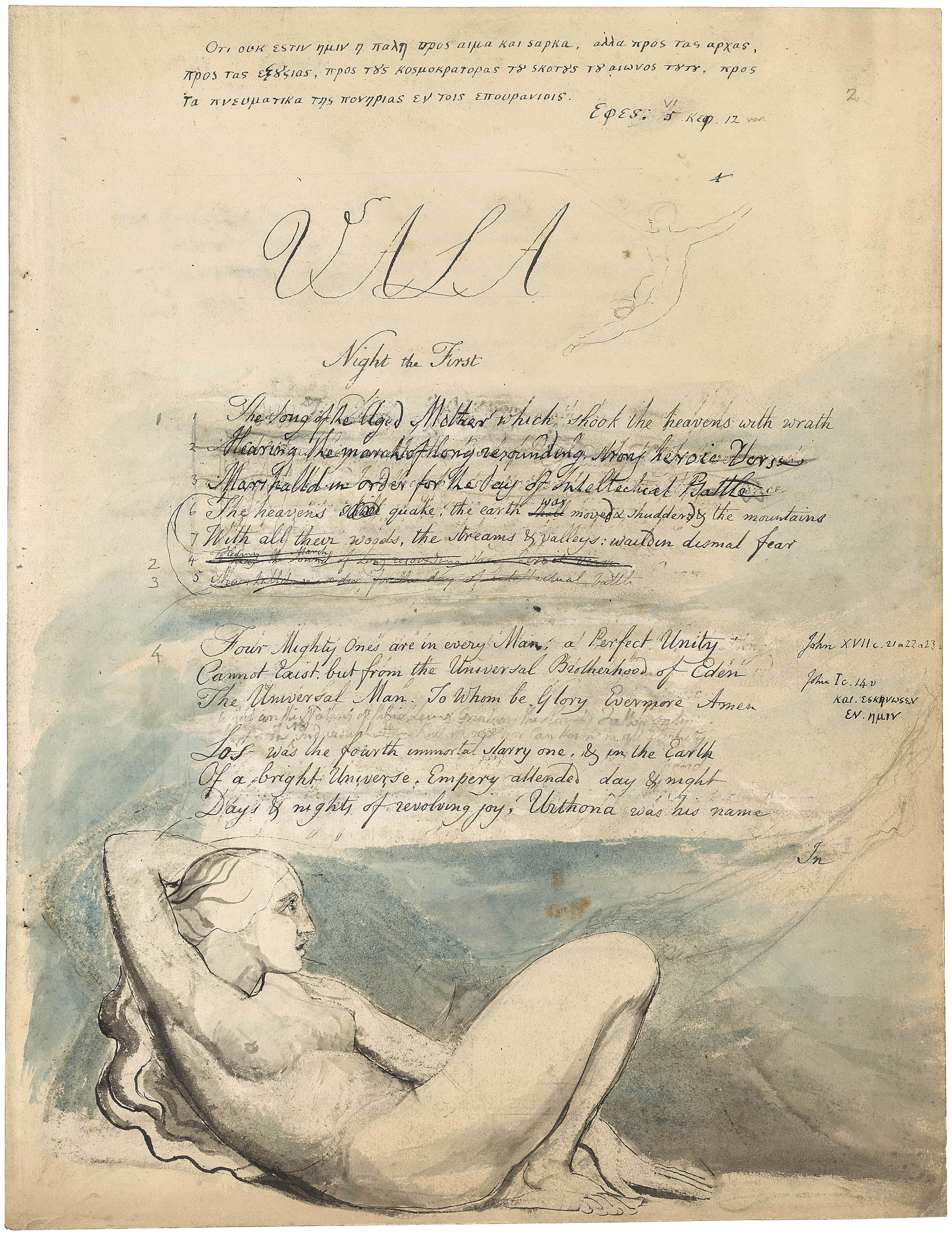
William Blake, The Four Zoas – manuscript, page 3

The poem is divided into nine "nights". An early draft begins:

This is the Dirge of Eno which shook the heavens with wrath
And thus beginneth the Book of Vala which Whosoever reads
If with his Intellect he comprehend the terrible Sentence
The heavens shall quake, the earth shall move & shudder & the mountains
With all their woods, the streams & valleys: wail in dismal fear

In the second "night", the theme of women ruling is discussed but there is an emphasis on how the ability to create constricts them. Humanity is imprisoned by creation, and experience causes great pain:

What is the price of Experience? do men buy it for a song
Or wisdom for a dance in the street? No it is bought with the price
Of all that a man hath, his house his wife his children.
Wisdom is sold in the desolate market where none come to buy
And in the witherd field where the farmer plows for bread in vain

— Night the Second, lines 397-401 (Page 35, lines 11–15)

The final "night" describes Los witnessing a vision of Christ's crucifixion at the hands of Urizen. In response:

…Los his vegetable hands
Outstretchd; his right hand branching out in fibrous Strength,
Siezd the Sun; his left hand like dark roots cover[e]d the Moon
And tore them down cracking the heavens across from immense to immense.
Then fell the fires of Eternity with loud & shrill
Sound of Loud Trumpet thundering along from heaven to heaven
A mighty sound articulate "Awake ye dead & come
To Judgement from the four winds! Awake & come away!"
Folding like scrolls of the Enormous volume of Heaven & Earth
With thunderous noise & dreadful shakings racking to & fro,
The heavens are shaken & the Earth removed from its place

— Night the Ninth, lines 6-16 (Page 117, lines 6–16)

Vala concludes:

…Urthona rises from the ruinous walls
In all his ancient strength to form the golden armour of science
For intellectual War. The war of swords departed now,
The dark Religions are departed & sweet Science reigns.

— Night the Ninth, lines 852-855 (Page 139, lines 7–10)

== Themes ==
Like many of Blake's works, designs in Vala depict sexual activity or the genitals of the individual. Blake used these images as part of a general celebration of sex and sexuality. This emphasis on free sexuality occurs in The Marriage of Heaven and Hell, Visions of the Daughters of Albion, and Blake's designs based on the Book of Enoch. Blake's beliefs emphasised the need for sexual openness in relationships and the lack of jealousy. In Vala, the idea of jealousy is a central theme and one of the bases for the story.

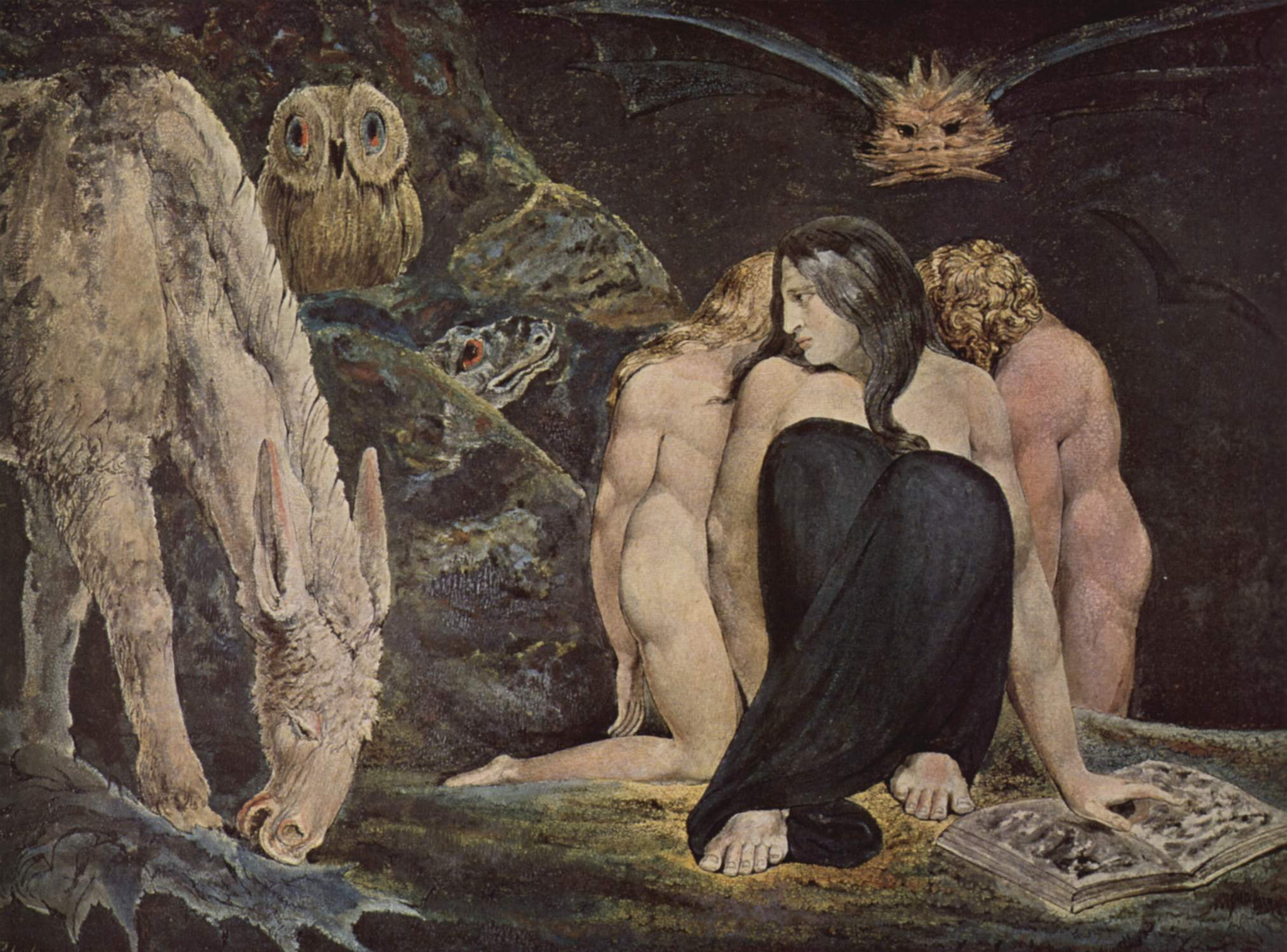
The Night of Enitharmon's Joy, 1795 William Blake

Between the various editions, the concept of the poem changes. The later edition was on a smaller conceptual scale, and it emphasises the concept of imprisonment found in the Book of Urizen. The early version emphasised the nature of intelligence and spiritual problems. The later edition placed an emphasis on the idea of renovation being found within Christianity. As Blake revised the poem, he added more concrete images and connected the plot to the histories of the Druids and of the Christians along with adding various locations connected to them. In both editions of the poem, Blake changed his mythological system in the Book of Urizen from a dualistic struggle between two divine powers to a struggle of four aspects split from Eternity. These aspects are Blake's Four Zoas, which represent four aspects of the Almighty God and Vala is the first work to mention them. In particular, Blake's God/Man union is broken down into the bodily components of Urizen (head), Urthona (loins), Luvah (heart), and Tharmas (unity of the body) with paired Emanations being Ahania (wisdom, from the head), Enitharmon (what can't be attained in nature, from the loins), Vala (nature, from the heart), and Enion (earth mother, from the separation of unity). As connected to Blake's understanding of the divine, the Zoas are the God the Father (Tharmas, sense), the Son of God (Luvah, love), the Holy Ghost (Urthona, imagination), and Satan who was originally of the divine substance (Urizen, reason), and their Emanations represent Sexual Urges (Enion), Nature (Vala), Inspiration (Enitharmon), and Pleasure (Ahania).

Blake believed that each person had a twofold identity with one half being good and the other evil. In Vala, both the character Orc and The Eternal Man discuss their selves as divided. By the time he was working on his later works, including Vala, Blake felt that he was able to overcome his inner battle but he was concerned about losing his artistic abilities. These thoughts carried over into Vala as the character Los (imagination) is connected to the image of Christ, and he added a Christian element to his mythic world. In the revised version of Vala, Blake added Christian and Hebrew images and describes how Los experiences a vision of the Lamb of God that regenerates Los's spirit. In opposition to Christ is Urizen and the Synagogue of Satan, who later crucifies Christ. It is from them that Deism is born.

== Critical response ==
In 1945, Northrop Frye claimed: "There is nothing like the colossal explosion of creative power in the Ninth Night of The Four Zoas anywhere else in English poetry." G. E. Bentley Jr., in 2003, believed that Blake's "most extraordinary achievement" between the "prodigious years" of 1795 and 1800 was Vala in addition to claiming that "The poem provides a profound analysis of man's limitations but no hint of escape from the prison".
