= Urthona =

One of the four Zoas in the mythological writings of William Blake

In the mythological writings of William Blake, Urthona is one of the four Zoas, who were created when Albion, the primordial man, was divided fourfold. Specifically, he is the Zoa of inspiration and creativity, and he is a blacksmith god. His female counterpart is Enitharmon. Urthona usually appears in his "fallen" form, that of Los.

== Character ==
Urthona (likely intended to imply "earth owner") is one of the Four Zoas and represents both the north and imagination within the individual. He is aligned with the Christian Trinity in the aspect of the Holy Ghost and is opposed to Urizen, the Zoa of reason. He is the last to be created, and his corresponding element is Earth. In his eternal form, he is portrayed as a blacksmith, working in his forge in Golgonooza. In terms of senses, he is represented by the ear, in terms of art he is represented by poetry, and in his fallen form, his profession is religion. He and Luvah are the guardians of the gates of heaven. Unlike the other Zoas, he does not have a direct Emanation counterpart; instead, Enitharmon is usually described as an emanation from Urthona's fallen state, Los. In his original state, Urthona represents the loins of the body. As a blacksmith, Urthona is connected to the animal the Mole, which is symbolic of mining aspects.

Urthona rarely appears directly in Blake's work, usually taking the form of Los, who plays a prominent role in the fall and redemption of mankind, most notably described in Jerusalem The Emanation of the Giant Albion. His place within the fall is as a blacksmith who prepares the items for divine farming, and he is able to realize the problems of the Eternals struggling against each other. When Luvah and Urizen went to war over the state of mankind (Albion), Urthona was split from Los, a Spectre of his form, and he became a serpent. The Urthona form joined with the unconscious mind called Nadir. He has four aspects in the fallen world, with Los being Urthona's aspect of humanity, Enitharmon as the Emanation connected to Los, a Spectre form, and a Shadow form. When Los dies (entering the "Void outside of Existence") and destroys both the sun and the moon, Urthona is reborn but then disappears. At the time of the Last Judgment and the feast in heaven, Urthona is already present when the others arrive. He is subsequently connected to the god Vulcan, and he is the miller during the harvest before he becomes the baker of the "Bread of Ages". In the end, he is united with all of his aspects.

== Appearances ==
Urthona appears on his own in many works. An early mention of Urthona comes in "A Song of Liberty" that describes how Urizen is buried underneath Urthona's realm. In America a Prophecy, the figure of the Shadowy Female is described as one of his daughters and Orc, as a serpent, is wrapped around Urthona's pillars. In Europe a Prophecy, Los describes that Urthona is resting while Urizen is free from his chains. During most of the poem, Los is not present while Enitharmon dominates the world.

Urthona's background and origins are described in Vala, or The Four Zoas. The work describes the relationship between Los and Urthona and how the Emanations of Urthona and Los operate. It also describes his regeneration at the Final Judgment. Blake's poem Milton a Poem describes aspects of Urthona, such as his connection to the North and to Poetry. The work also describes Urthona as dark. In Jerusalem The Emanation of the Giant Albion, Blake explains how Urthona is divided within the world and elaborates on other aspects of his history.
