= Luvah =

One of the four Zoas in the mythological writings of William Blake

In the mythological writings of William Blake, Luvah is one of the four Zoas, who were created when Albion, the primordial man, was divided fourfold. He represents love, passion, and rebellious energy. His Emanation (female counterpart) is Vala; his fallen form is Orc. Throughout Blake's mythological system, he is opposed to Urizen, the representation of reason. He is also connected to Jesus, who takes upon his form as the being of love after Luvah falls and turns to a being of hate.

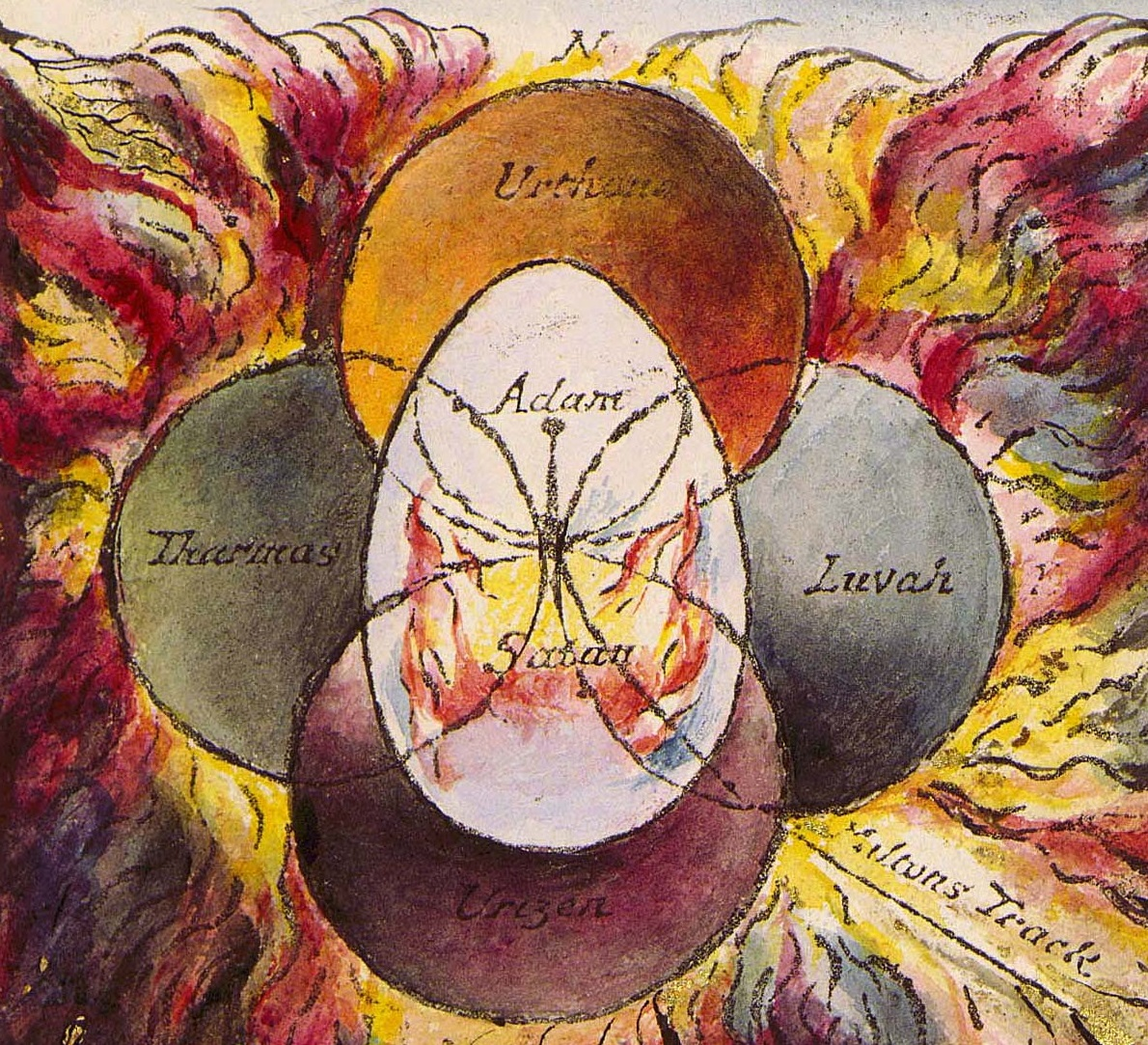
An illustration of the relationship of the Four Zoas from one of Blake's works, Milton a Poem

== Character ==
Luvah represents a generative aspect that is connected to experience. In Blake's system, Luvah, the third Zoa, represents emotion as the Prince of Love, and his name may be connected to the word "lover". Love is the supreme emotion, and it is connected to all others, including hate. Luvah is connected to the heart. He is connected to Jesus, and the Incarnation is the result of Luvah transforming into hate; Jesus replaced Luvah's physical form after Luvah descended from his position. As such, Jesus is the physical aspect of Love and he suffers what Luvah would suffer. When Urizen witnesses Jesus in that form, he becomes upset and afraid of the new Luvah.

Luvah's emanation, Vala, originated as two innocent individuals that were separated by Vala being impregnated by Albion. From that union, Urizen was created. When the Fallen Man looked upon Vala, she was separated from Luvah, and she hid from him. Urizen joins with Luvah in order to control mankind, with Urizen seeking to dominate the imagination and would allow Luvah to dominate reason. However, Luvah does not accept but does steal Urizen's horses, which sparks a war between the two. During this time, Urthona falls and divides. Urizen soon withdraws from the war, and Tharmas strikes down both Luvah and Vala, which causes them to both fall. As this happens, Albion is brought low, and Urizen becomes the ruler. Urizen punishes Luvah by placing him within the Furnaces of Affliction, with Vala feeding the furnaces. The furnaces causes Luvah to melt, and Urizen uses the metallic remains of Luvah to create the universe, which represents reason's solidification of emotions. This leads to Luvah, in the form of a cloud, constantly tormenting Albion, which represents suppressed desires. Albion opposes Luvah, and he falls. Soon, he is born from Enitharmon in the form of Orc. Thus, he transitions from Love into Hate. From him comes wars, including the Napoleonic Wars, and he stars wrecking the body of Albion.

After Orc is born, the jealous Los uses the Chains of Jealousy to bind Orc upon a mountain. While bound, his imagination is able to exist in a cave located in Urizen's kingdom, which wakes up Urizen. When Urizen seeks out Orc, Orc is freed as he changes into a serpent. The form is corrupted and he is turned into a satanic image. Orc spends his time rebelling against Urizen, and it is only when Urizen stops fighting Orc that Orc is able to become Luvah.

After the Final Judgment, Albion makes Luvah the servant of Urizen, which represents reason controlling love and ensuring that there is only creation. Albion tells Urizen to let Luvah rage enough to allow for the hate to burn out. Luvah's role in the harvest, he is a singer and is able to unite with Vala before joining Albion only to be cast away until the Zoas can all join with Albion.

== Appearances ==
The first appearance of Luvah is in The Book of Thel, but he is not mentioned again until Vala, or The Four Zoas. The history of Luvah's origins, war on Albion, and his involvement as Orc are described in Vala along with descriptions of his return to his Luvah state after the Final Judgment. Blake's Milton a Poem describes various aspects of Luvah's story, including his tomb at Golgonooza where the dead Luvah resided. In Jerusalem The Emanation of the Giant Albion, Luvah is connected with the various warring individuals through Los's dividing of the world of life and death. The work also explains how Jesus allowed for Luvah to fight against Albion, as Luvah's hate must be expressed before it can be purged.
