= Jerusalem: The Emanation of the Giant Albion =

Prophetic book by William Blake

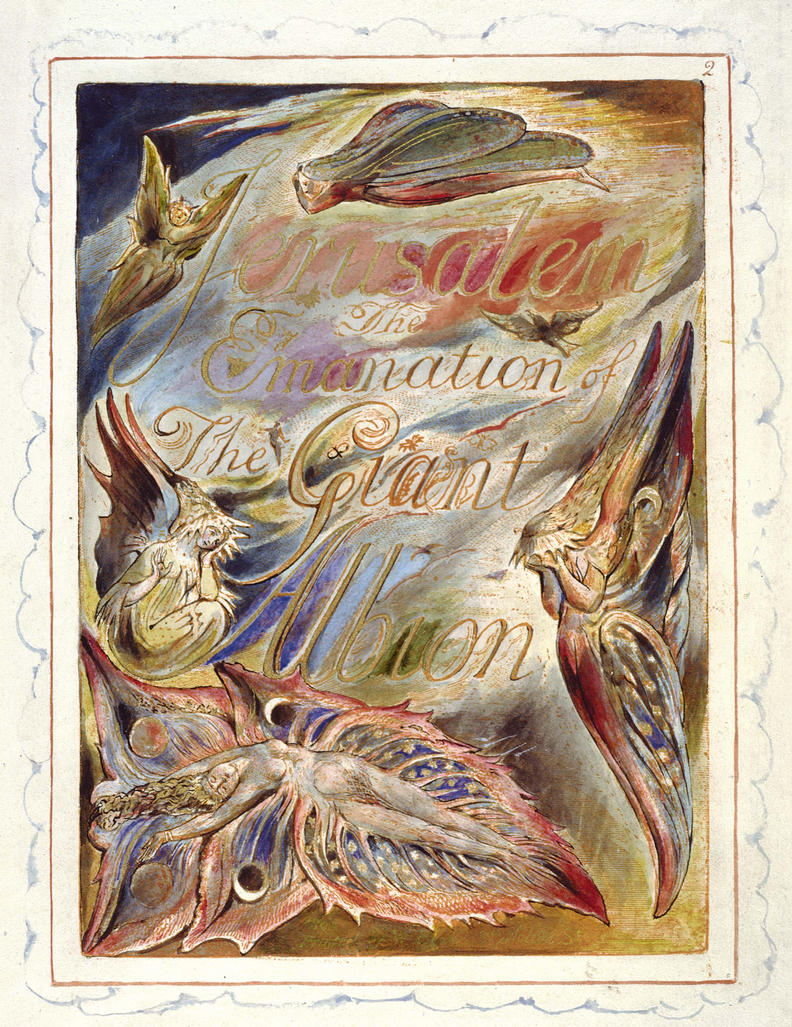
Plate 2. Title page, copy E.

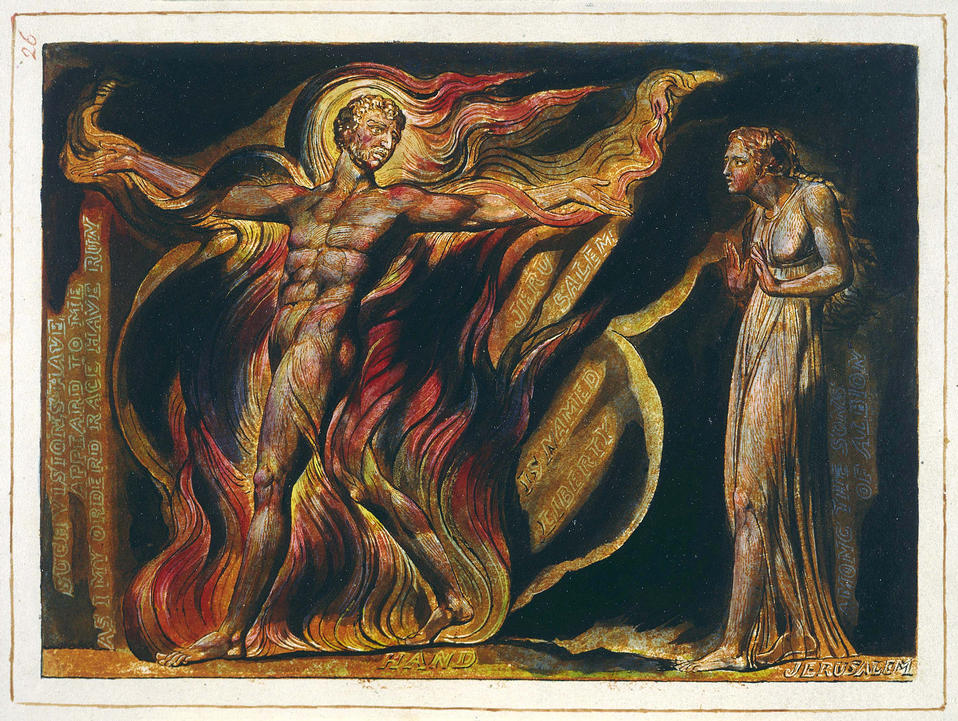
An image of ‘Hand’ and ‘Jerusalem’ falls published in the book between chapters one and two. This image is plate 26 of Jerusalem the Emanation of the Giant Albion, copy E. It is tilted on its side in the manuscript.

Jerusalem: The Emanation of the Giant Albion (1804–1820, with additions made even later) is a prophetic book by English poet William Blake. Jerusalem is the last, longest and greatest in scope of Blake's works. Etched in handwriting, accompanied by small sketches, marginal figures and huge full-plate illustrations, it has been described as "visionary theatre". The poet himself believed it was his masterpiece and it has been said that "of all Blake's illuminated epics, this is by far the most public and accessible".

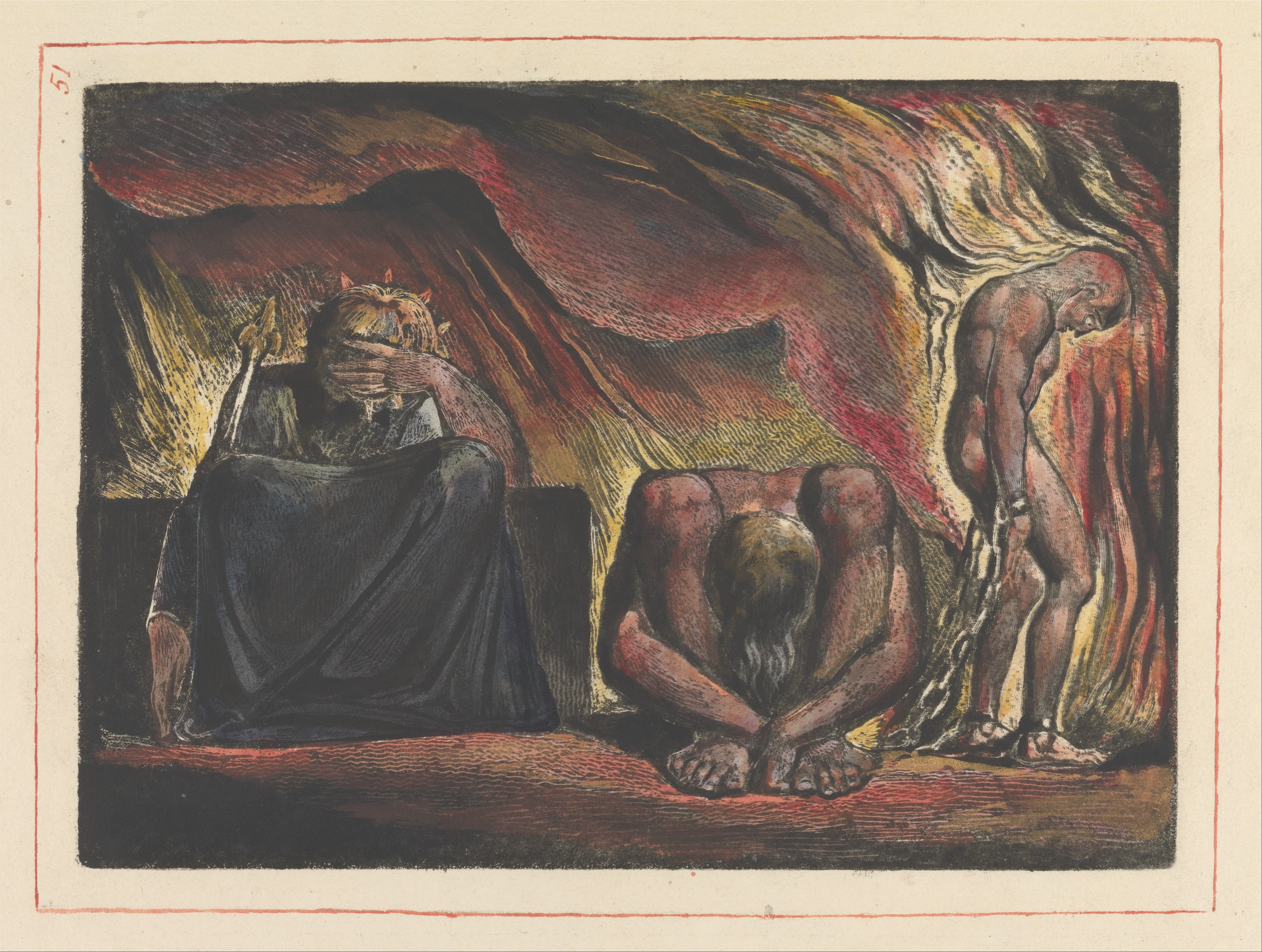
Skofeld wearing "mind forged manacles", plate 51, copy E

Nonetheless, only six copies were printed in Blake's lifetime and the book, like all of Blake's prophetic works, was all but ignored by his contemporaries.

The lyric to the famous hymn Jerusalem (text also by Blake, with music by Sir Hubert Parry) is not connected to this poem. It is in fact taken from the preface to another of Blake's "prophetic books", Milton.

== Production technique ==
The poem, which was produced between 1804 and 1820, consists of 100 etched and illustrated plates, thus making it Blake's longest single work. The illustrated plates were made using Blake's self-devised technique of "illuminated printing", which required each copy to be individually coloured and produced, plate by plate. Blake was not averse to changing the text of some plates between printings or changing the colouring, as a result of which no two original copies of the poem are the same.

Six copies (A-F) were printed between 1820 and 1827. Four copies (G–J) are posthumous (1832). Copy B is incomplete and includes only the First Chapter (25 plates). The arrangement of the Second chapter is different in early (A & C) and late (D & E) copies. Copy F, which was collated later in 1827 by John Linnell, is arranged like early copy C.

There are only two coloured copies (B & E). Copy B being incomplete, the sole complete extant colour edition of the work (copy E) is in the collection of the Yale Center for British Art in New Haven, Connecticut.

=== Plate 1. Frontispiece. Los enters the Door of Death ===
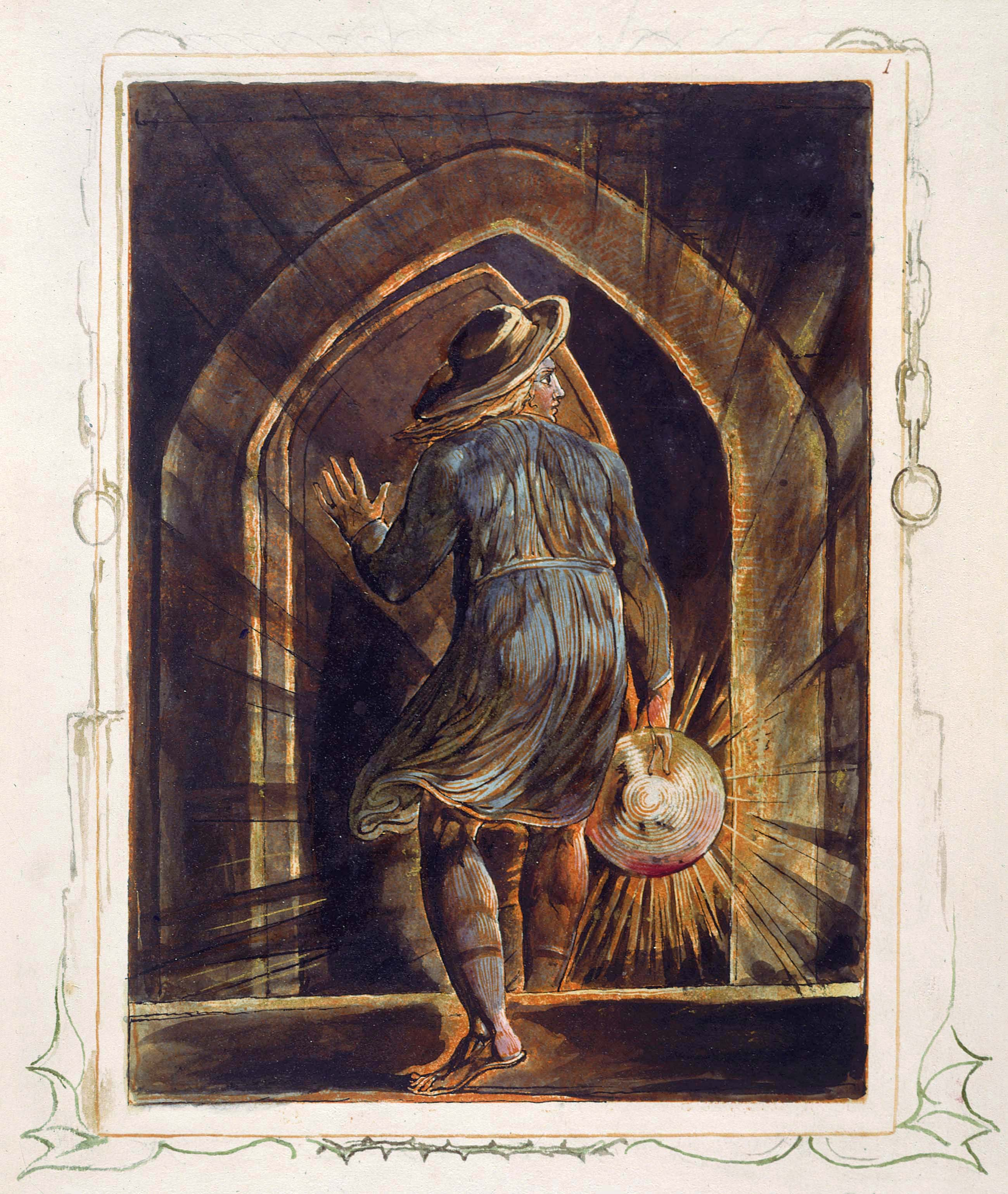
Plate 1. Frontispiece, copy E (Yale Center for British Art).

The design corresponds to the following lines originally incised in the plate (see below the Separate proof in Fitzwilliam Museum), but erased later:

There is a Void, outside of Existence, which if enterd into
Englobes itself & becomes a Womb

Half Friendship is the bitterest Enmity said Los
As he enterd the Door of Death for Albions sake Inspired
The long sufferings of God are not for ever there is a Judgment

— Plate 1, lines 1-2 and 8-10

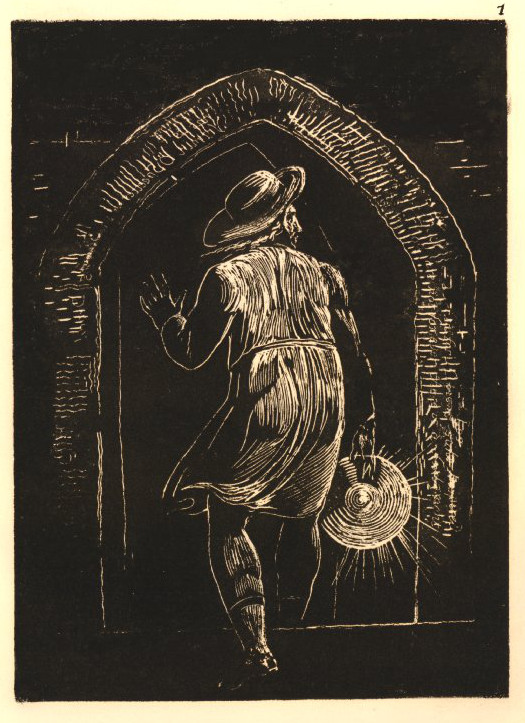
Copy A (British Museum).

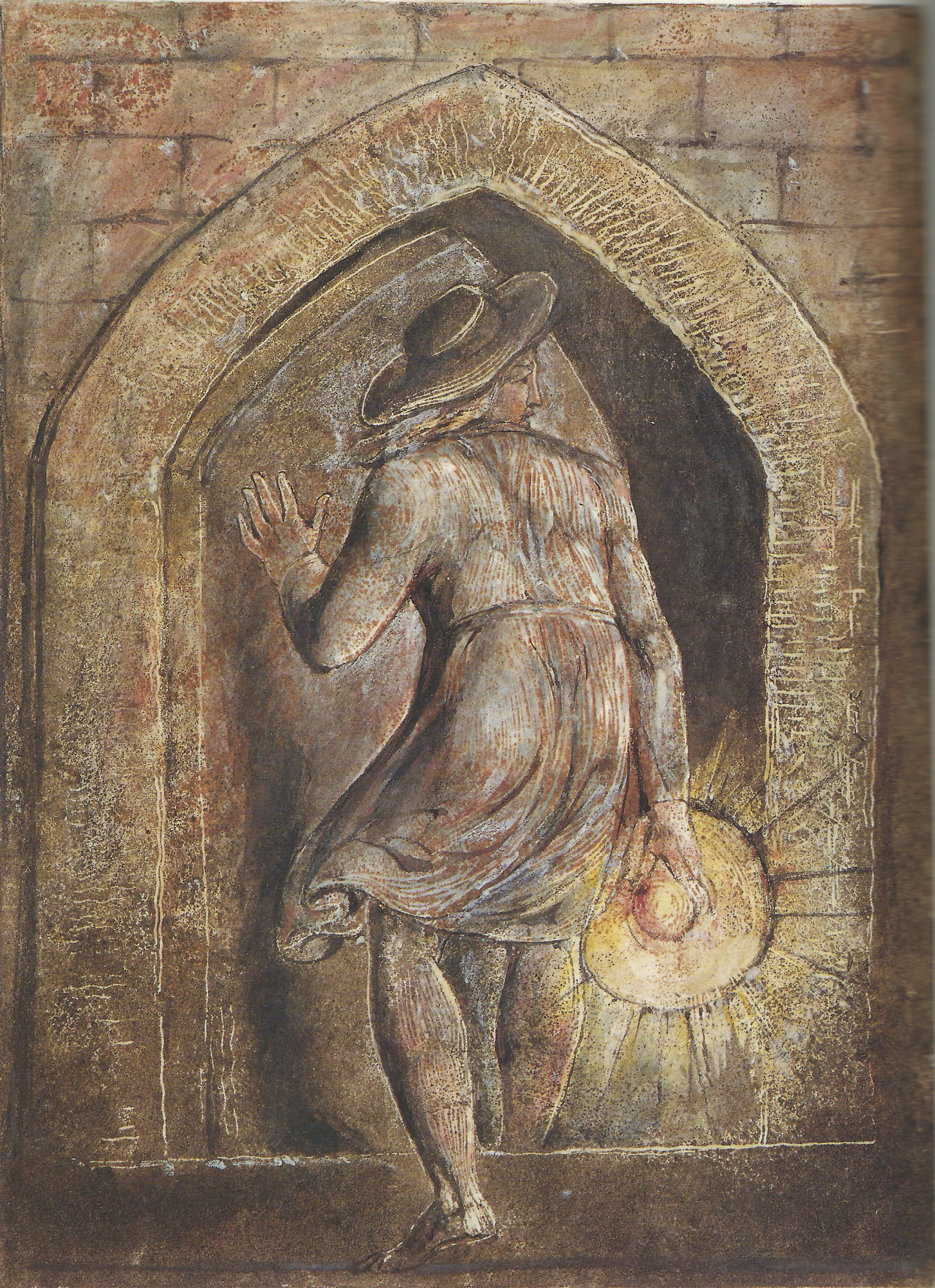
Copy B (Lord Cunliffe's Collection).

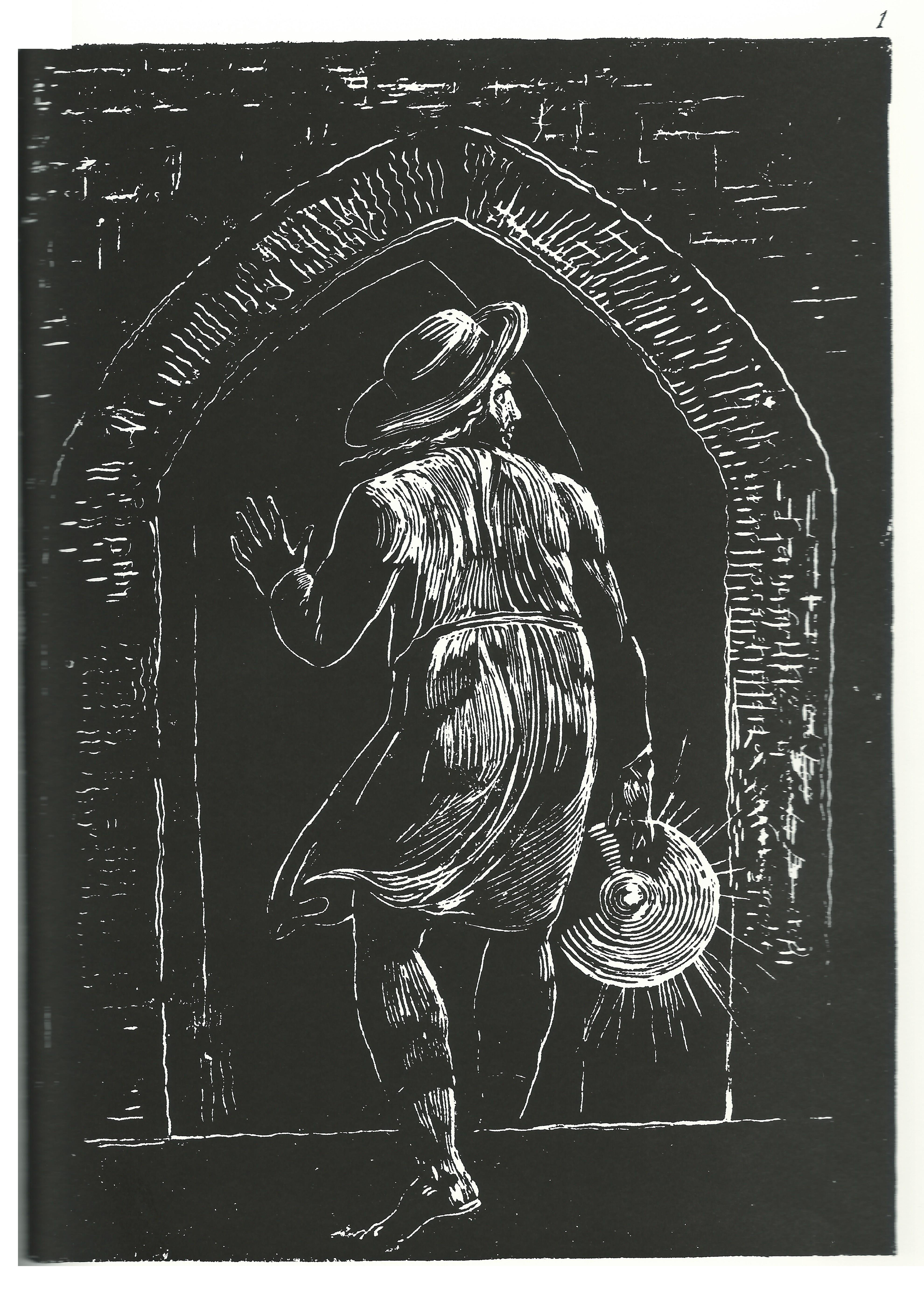
Copy C (Mrs. Ramsey Harvey's Collection).

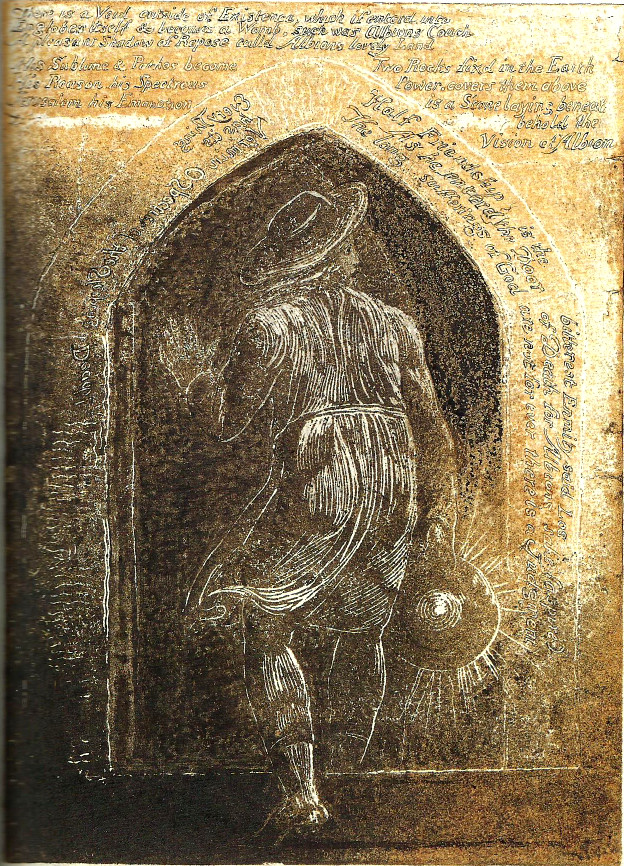
Separate proof (Fitzwilliam Museum).

== Summary of the poem ==
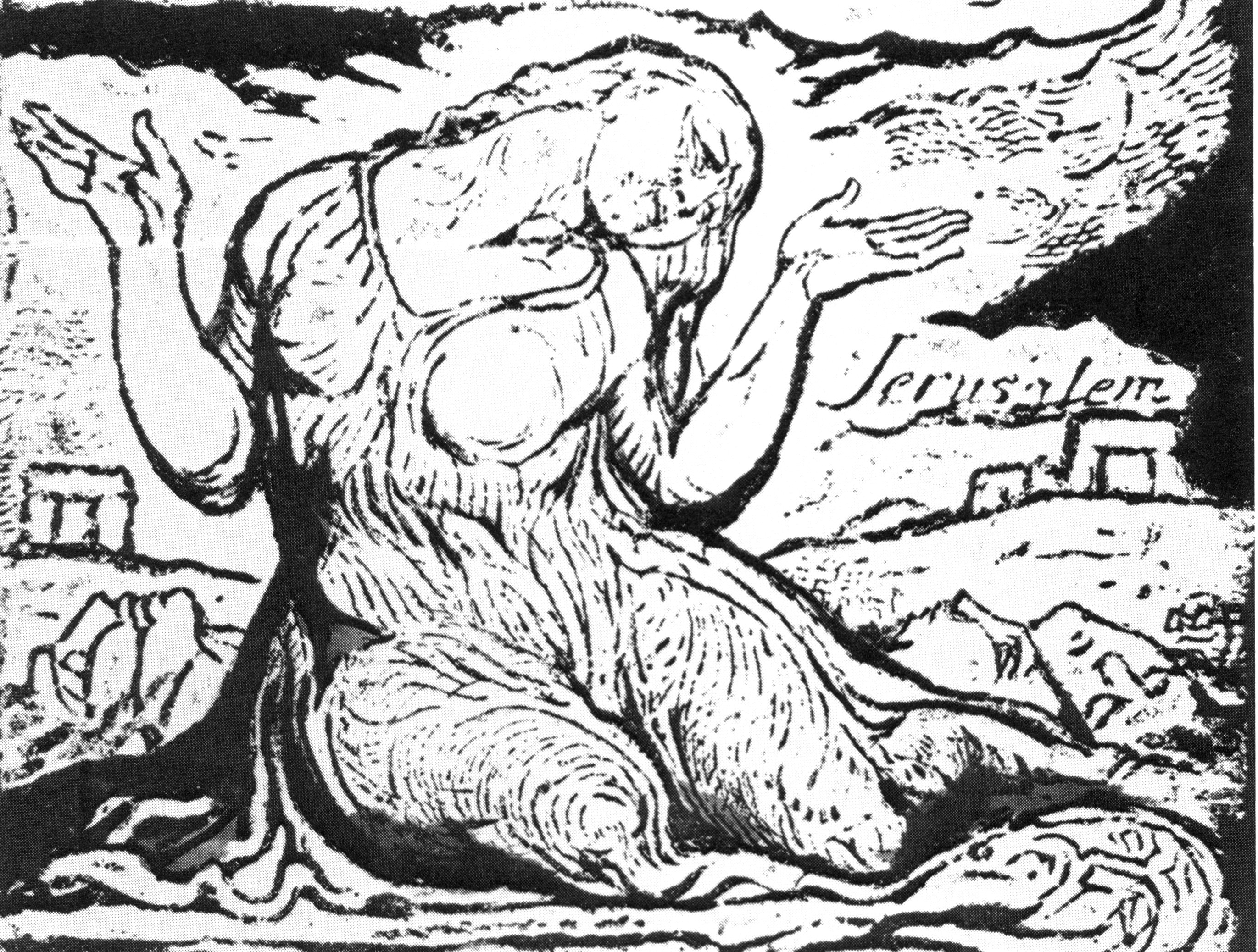
William Blake: Druid Rocks with pitying figure of Jerusalem. Copy A, Plate 92, detail (British Museum).

Jerusalem tells the story of the fall of Albion, Blake's embodiment of man, Britain or the western world as a whole.

The poetic narrative takes the form of a "drama of the psyche", couched in the dense symbolism of Blake's self-constructed mythology.

Because it includes a cast of billions, Jerusalem can seem confusing. The poem does not have a linear plot. Characters morph in and out of each other. A character can be a person and a place. Jerusalem, the Emanation of Albion, is a woman and a city. Albion, "the Universal Humanity", is a man and a land (Britain). He contains twelve sons who co-inhere with the twelve tribes of Israel, as well as Four Zoas. Every Zoa (embodying a life principle) has an Emanation (a feminine figure through which the human can become divine). The Zoas and Emanations include:

- Tharmas, the primal man, linked with Enion, an earth mother.
- Urthona, the spirit of inspiration, embodied in Los, the prophetic artist, who forges a city of art in his furnaces. Enitharmon, his Emanation, weaves beams of beauty.
- Luvah, the "feeling-function" Zoa, is Albion's spectre, whose counterpart Vala is Jerusalem's shadow. Vala eroticises war.
- Urizen embodies Reason. Gracious Ahania is his Emanation.

== Chapter summaries ==
=== Chapter One: To the Public ===
Jerusalem's first chapter tells the story of Albion's fall into Selfhood. Its overture sets the scene for Los's journey into Albion's interior and humanity's transfiguration in forgiveness of sins. In the first scene, Albion banishes Jerusalem and Jesus, blighting nature, culture and his internal life. Then Los contends with his Spectre, forcing him to work for Albion's restoration. Jerusalem mourns, animating shadowy Vala as Los builds Golgonooza, a city that can open into Edenic Eternity. Urizenic rationality assaults Jerusalem and enshrouds the life of the mind. Los battles against this, mapping Britain onto Israel, but his shadowy Spectre infects him with wrath and shame, stalking Albion's daughters and empowering Albion's warrior sons who banish Jerusalem. Vala tries to seduce Jerusalem. Albion curses them both, and finds himself enmeshed in Vala's deadly veil. He refuses divine forgiveness.

=== Chapter Two: To the Jews ===
Blake's Jews co-inhere with bellicose British Druids. In this chapter Los and a host of angelic Eternals attempt to rescue Albion. Los's Spectre and Emanation appear as refugees, fleeing from Albion to tell their version of his fall. Los journeys into Albion's interior where bloodthirsty Vala is worshipped. Then Los sensually constricts Reuben (Albion's son) in an attempt to control his lusts as Jesus imaginatively creates states through which humanity can find forgiveness. Angelmorphic Eternals (cathedral cities) seek to help Albion, but they too get blighted by Selfhood. Los rouses them, but Albion chooses to remain trapped. Vala tramples Jerusalem but wise Erin (Ireland) separates the poem's heroine from Albion in whose body she is infected with bellicose Moral Law.

=== Chapter Three: To the Deists ===
Blake's Deists create more violence than the Christianity they critique. When the chapter begins Albion's rational Moral Law infects Los, Albion falls yet again, and Vala's bellicose erotics encompass humanity. Urizen builds what he thinks is a redemptive Druid temple and Jerusalem works in Satanic mills where, infected by industrial chaos and Albion's morality, she can barely perceive Jesus and divine forgiveness. Vala melds with the rational beast, spreading war throughout the world, and her daughters enjoy human sacrifice. The peace of "heavenly Canaan" still hovers above Ulro's chaos, but Los fallibly builds Golgonooza which becomes the structure of "Religion Hid in War". The harlot-dragon reigns.

=== Chapter Four: To the Christians ===
Now universal humanity awakens to forgiveness. Jerusalem finally melds love with wrath, confronting shadowy Vala whose daughters weave death. As Los sings, Jerusalem appears tri-locational, emanating angelmorphic and descending as a city and a woman. Sexual contentions obstruct Los' work and Vala thrusts her wrath cup upon Jerusalem who is devoured by the dragon to rise again. Los keeps building, freeing himself from gender disputes. Time ends. The Breath Divine breathes. Albion awakens, and sees that Los is Christ and Christ is Los. He throws himself into Los's fires which become fountains of living water. Fragmented Zoas reunite in wars of love, in the Song of Jerusalem. All living things become a great Divine Body.

== Artistic influence in other media ==
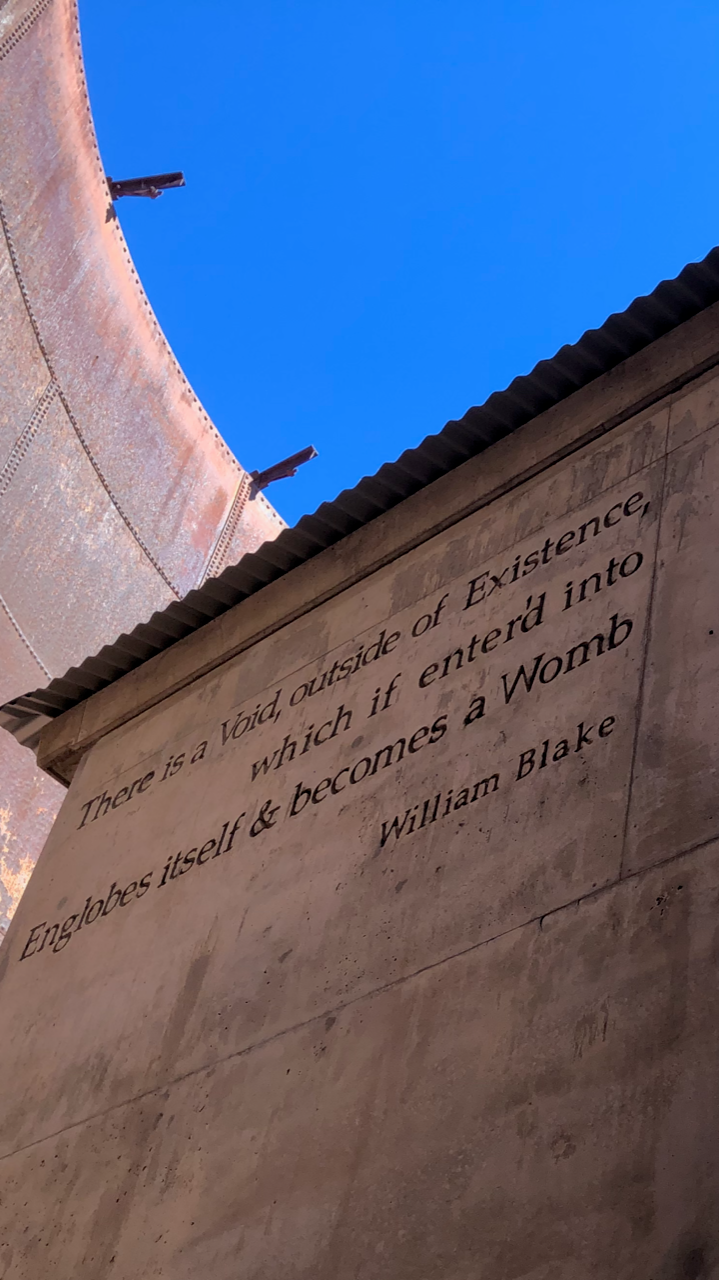
Inscription in the north-eastern wall of the Cobar Sound Chapel.

The book was an important inspiration behind composer Georges Lentz's sound installation, the Cobar Sound Chapel, in Australia, and the first lines from the poem can be found inscribed in the Chapel's north-eastern concrete wall (see picture above of Plate 1 in the Fitzwilliam Museum separate proof. The Fitzwilliam copy is the only version containing these particular lines. They were erased in later copies).
