= Golgonooza =

Mythical city

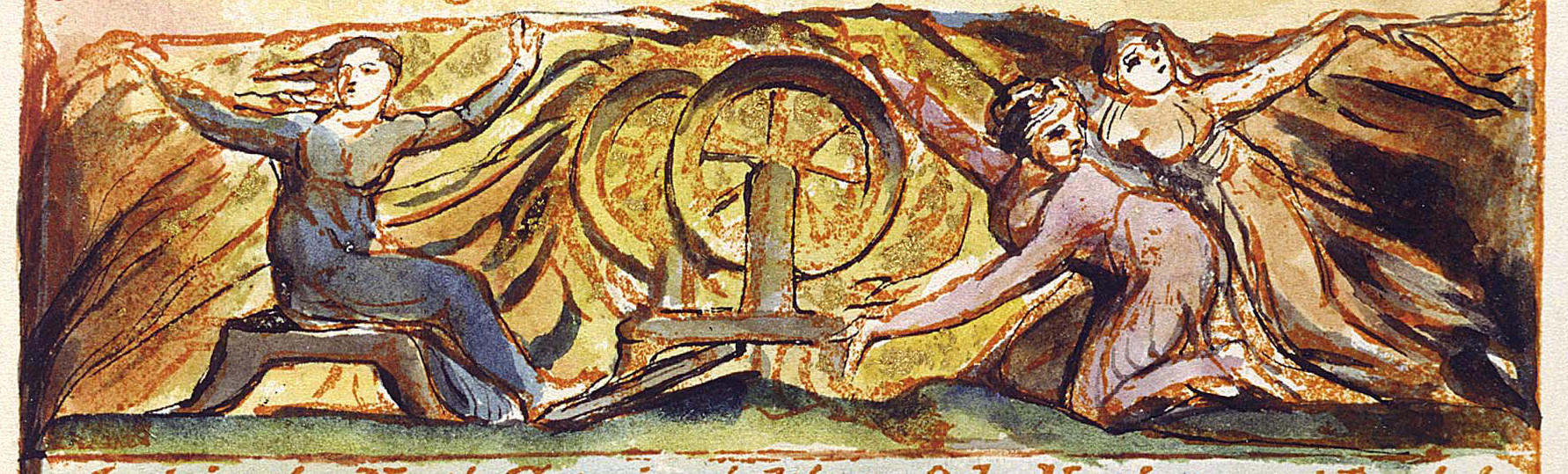
William Blake. Daughters of Los and Enitharmon in the Looms of Golgonooza. Jerusalem. Copy E, Plate 59 (cropped)

Golgonooza is a mythical city in the work of William Blake. Golgonooza is a City of Imagination built by Los, the spiritual Four-fold London, a vision of London and also linked to Jerusalem and is Blake's great city of art and science.

The city consists of the physical bodies of man and woman. There is Los's palace (the intellect) in the South and his forge with furnaces in the middle called Bowlahoola (the organs of the animal man). "In the North Gate, in the West of the North, toward Beulah" there is the golden hall of Cathedron that contains the Enitharmon's looms (the womb), where the physical body of man is woven. There is the Gate of Luban (the vagina) in the middle of the city. All these are surrounded with a moat of fire. Golgonooza is walled against Satan and his wars. Around the city there is the land of Allamanda (the nervous system of the vegetated man) in the forests of Entuthon Benython with the Lake of Udan Adan.

Fourfold internal structure of the city reflects the fourfold structure of the Sons of Los. Blake explains this as follows:

Fourfold the Sons of Los in their divisions: and fourfold,
The great City of Golgonooza: fourfold toward the north
And toward the south fourfold, & fourfold toward the east & west
Each within other toward the four points: that toward
Eden, and that toward the World of Generation,
And that toward Beulah, and that toward Ulro:
Ulro is the space of the terrible starry wheels of Albions sons:
But that toward Eden is walled up, till time of renovation:
Yet it is perfect in its building, ornaments & perfection.

(Jerusalem 12:45-53)

Building Golgonooza Los stands in London on the banks of the Thames but it covers the whole of Britain:

From Golgonooza the spiritual Four-fold London eternal
In immense labours & sorrows, ever building, ever falling,
Thro Albions four Forests which overspread all the Earth,
From London Stone to Blackheath east: to Hounslow west:
To Finchley north: to Norwood south: and the weights
Of Enitharmons Loom play lulling cadences on the winds of Albion
From Caithness in the north, to Lizard-point & Dover in the south

(Milton 6:1-7)

== See also ==
- List of fictional towns in literature
- Golgonooza Letter Foundry and Press
