= Emanation in the Eastern Orthodox Church =

Neoplatonic belief

Emanation (literally "dripping") is a belief, found in Neoplatonism, that the cause of certain beings or states of being consists of an overflow from the essence of God or other higher spiritual beings, as opposed to a special act of creation. This overflow is usually conceived in a non-temporal way as a permanent relationship of causation rather than as an event causing an entity to come into existence at a given point in time. The word "emanation" can refer either to the process of emanation or to the thing emanated.

Equivalent concepts are found in Gnosticism and in Kabbalah (Jewish mysticism). This article explores similar concepts in Eastern Orthodoxy and Eastern Catholicism.

== Concepts ==
The Neoplatonic concept of emanation can be compared to the statements made by fourteenth-century Eastern Orthodox theologian Gregory Palamas. He drew a distinction between God's essence and energies, affirming that God was unknowable in His essence, but knowable in His energies.

Palamas never enumerated God's energies but described them as ways that God could act in the universe, and particularly on people, from the light shining from the face of Moses after he descended from Mount Sinai, to the light surrounding Moses, Elijah and Jesus on Mount Tabor during the transfiguration of Jesus. For Palamas, God's energies were not separate from God, but were God. However, the idea of energies was kept distinct from the idea of the three Persons of the Trinity, the unity of the Three Persons of the Trinity being united by God's transcendent Essence.

The Orthodox theologian Niketas Stethatos describes a tenfold hierarchy, which can be paralleled in both the Kabbalistic belief in ten successive emanations, known as Sefirot, and the Neopythagorean belief in the power of the first ten numbers, as set out in Theologoumena Arithmeticae, an anonymous work ascribed to Iamblichus or Anatolius of Laodice:

Nikitas Stithatos' decad has affinities with the decads of both the foregoing theories (Kabbalistic and Pythagorean decads), although it cannot be identified with either. It has roots in the conception of the celestial hierarchy or concatenation formulated by Saint Dionysios the Areopagite.

This hierarchy constitutes a threefold structure, each level of which consists of three orders or ranks of celestial intelligences, giving a total of nine such interlocking and mutually participating orders. The function of the lowest of these orders, that of the angels, has two aspects. The first is to transmit the divine grace and illumination, which it has received from God through the meditation of the orders about it, to the order below it, the human order, that taken as a whole thus represents the tenth order, the second is to convert the human intelligence, the "finest of all the offerings; that can be made by this human order, so that it mounts upward and stage by stage returns, again through the meditation of the celestial hierarchy, to a state of union with its divine source and in this way achieves Divinization. This double meditation descending and ascending, constitutes the cyclic movement..."

He further states in On Spiritual Knowledge, verse 99, that, "The nine heavenly powers sing hymns of praise that have a threefold structure..."

- The Highest Rank: Thrones, Cherubim and Seraphim.
- The Middle Rank: Authorities, Dominions and Powers.
- The Lowest Rank: Principalities, Archangels and Angels.
- Humanity is the last component to complete the Decad.

In Judaism, a similar hierarchy can be found in the entirely non-Kabbalistic system of Maimonides, who posits ten ranks of angels (from the different Biblical terms for them), the lowest of which is Ishim, literally "men".

== See also ==
- Barlaamism
- Essence–Energies distinction
- Hierarchy of angels
- Neoplatonism and Christianity
- Orthodox Christian theology
- Palamism
- Subordinationism
- Theosis (Eastern Orthodox theology)
