= Enitharmon =

Character in William Blake's mythology

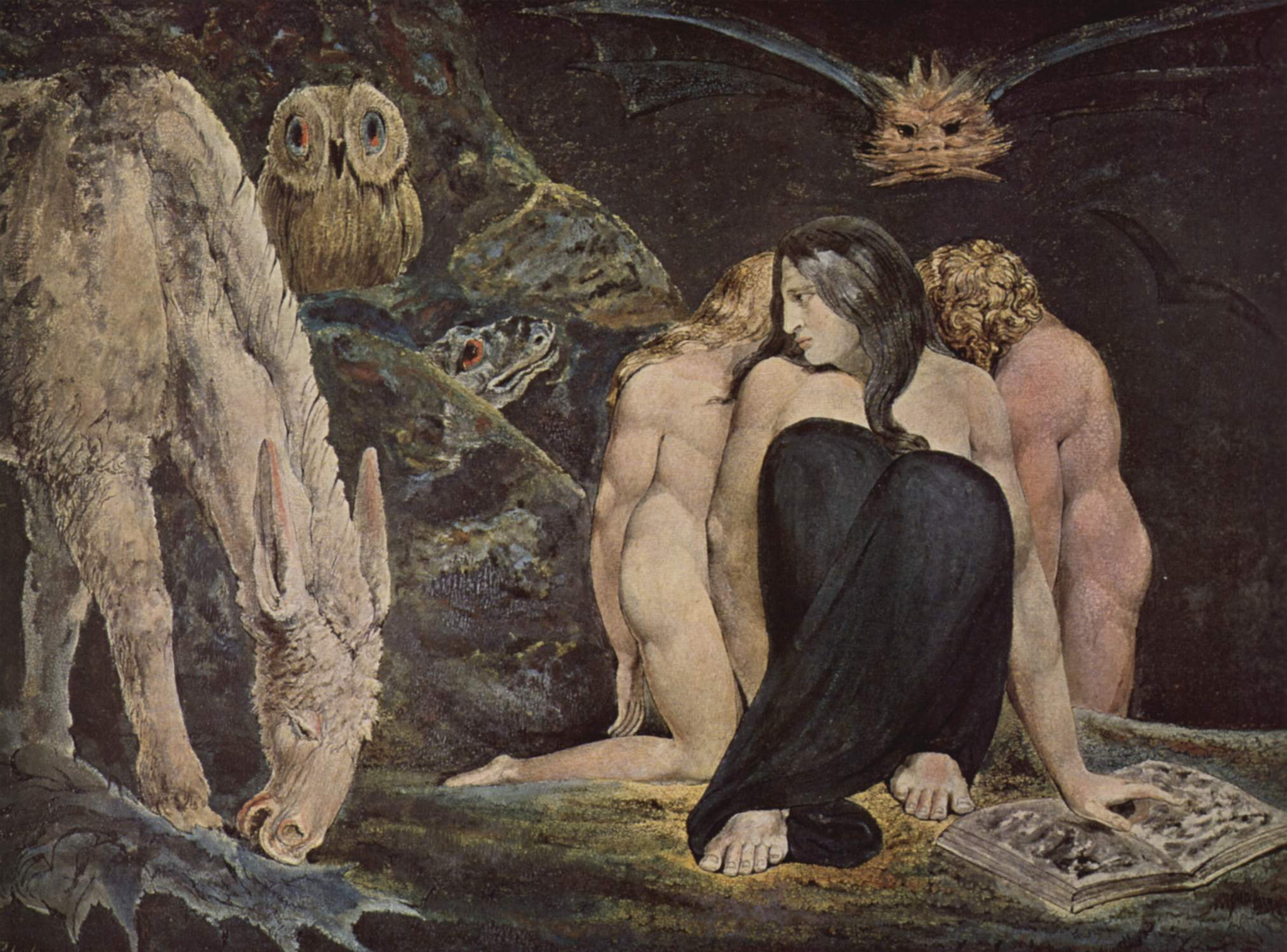
The Night of Enitharmon's Joy, 1795 William Blake

Enitharmon is a major female character in William Blake's mythology, playing a main part in some of his prophetic books. She is, but not directly, an aspect of the male Urthona, one of the Four Zoas. She is in fact the Emanation of Los, also male. There is a complex verbal nexus attached. The Zoa Tharmas has emanation Enion, and Eni-tharm(as)-on is one derivation of her name. That should perhaps be read in the inverse direction though, as a construction of the Tharmas/Enion pair's names. Within Blake's myth, she represents female domination and sexual restraints that limit the artistic imagination. She, with Los, gives birth to various children, including Orc.

== Background ==
It is possible that the character Enitharmon was based on Blake's wife, Catherine Blake. In a letter from Blake to his friend Thomas Butts, Jr. on 22 November 1802, he claimed that his place at Surrey had "Enitharmon's bower". S. Foster Damon explained the name Enitharmon as a derivation or an elision of (z)enit(h)-harmon(y). This is to be read in the light of the mirrored name Los (Sol = Sun in Latin). He also suggested that the Greek anarithmon or "numberless" as another possible starting point for the name. Urthona is "earth-owner". Enitharmon is not therefore a simplistic Earth Goddess, but is also not disconnected from that role. Her name can also be broken down to form the names of her two material parents, Enion and Tharmas.

== Character ==
Enitharmon represents spiritual beauty and poetic inspiration. She is symbolised by the moon and she is characterised by Pity. With Los, she is connected to the North in that they were from Urthona, who dominates there. As poetic instinct, Enitharmon is represented as being born of the sexual problems that happen during puberty. She rules as the Queen of Heaven in Blake's works. In Enitharmon's connection to Urthona, who is represented by the loins, she is a goddess that represents what cannot be found within nature. In a natural cycle within Blake's myth, there is a repeating image of an Old Woman, who is represented by Rahab, Enitharmon, or Vala based on which part of the cycles are being discussed. Enitharmon represents what Los is trying to create, and he cannot have Enitharmon until he is able to complete his duty. In her connection to space, she represents the psychological aspects of unbound space upon the mind.

Unlike the other Emanations, she is not a shade of a divine form, but serves as a material wife of Los as well as his Emanation. Blake's early myth describes how she was born after Los gave a material form to Urizen, and she was born as the first female. In his later myth, the sight of Enitharmon's birth caused Urthona to fall and be born from Enion. In that version, both Los and Enitharmon spring from Enion. After her birth, Enitharmon declares that women will rule the world, with Man being given Love and Women being given Pride. This would create within men a fear of female dominance that would in turn bring them under control of the females. In her sexual system, there are four parts: Manathu-Varcyon (desire), Antamon (sperm), Theotormon (frustration), and finally Sotha (war). These are represented by sexual desire being contained to Ethinthus (body), which leads to Leutha (guilt), followed by Oothoon (frustration) and ends with Thiralatha (erotic dreams). In the last stage, war is the ultimate result of sexual repression. This war is connected to general war and to energy as a whole. Sex is supposed to lead to imagination and love. Love is supposed to leave one to a higher state, and the perversion of sexuality, in Blake's view, leads to destruction.

The Female Will is born from an object of affection refusing to give up its independence, and the concept represents what prohibits an individual from being able to have true vision. Under Eitharmon's rule, representing the rule of the Female Will, leads to Los and Enitharmon entering into a constant state of strife with each other. However, the conflict also leads to Los pursuing her and the two procreating. Urizen is able to take advantage of the struggling between the two by tempting them with the ability to judge Luvah and Vala. This causes both of them to lose the last bit of their innocence. Their union was thereafter filled with both envy and jealousy. Their union also causes Enion to lament over the fallen state that began from this. She is married to Los, and through their marriage Orc, the representation of revolution, is born. This symbolises the relationship between art and revolution. Los, however, grows jealous of Orc and chains him to a mountain. Enitharmon tries to intervene but Los is unable to release Orc. Following Orc, Enitharmon gives birth to many children. Of these, Satan, John Milton, and Mary are described as her children.

== Appearances ==
Enitharmon appears in Europe a Prophecy, which compares her rule in regards to the fall of Christian culture. Through her, oracles and the Olympian gods are brought back. The bulk of the work is devoted to Enitharmon's domination of the material world and puts forth various sexual rules through religion. Blake describes how these rules are errors found in orthodox Christianity. The Book of Urizen describes how Los's pity, Enitharmon, separated from him and became the first female after Los created a form for Urizen. In Vala, or The Four Zoas, she is similar to eve and she is the tempter of Los/Adam. The work also describes the connection of poetic instinct and sexuality, along with pointing out how she and her daughters are able to create various things, such as a body for various Spectres to be created. Milton a Poem describes how Enitharmon gave birth to many children, which included Milton himself. In the work, she is described as being connected to Space while Los is connected to Time. In Jerusalem The Emanation of the Giant Albion, she is connected to poetry, and she realizes that she must eventually vanish in the end. Enitharmon is described as having a Looking Glass, which reflects the Eternal world in the Material world. This image appears in the 99th illustration of Blake's to the works of Dante. The design shows the Queen of Heaven, who represents feminine rule and the glass is of materialism. She also appears as an illustration in The Marriage of Heaven and Hell.
