= William Blake's mythology =

Artificial mythology

The prophetic books of the English poet and artist William Blake contain an invented mythology, in which Blake worked to encode his spiritual and political ideas into a prophecy for a new age. This desire to recreate the cosmos is the heart of his work and his psychology. His myths often described the struggle between enlightenment and free love on the one hand, and restrictive education and morals on the other.

== Sources ==
Among Blake's inspirations were John Milton's Paradise Lost and Paradise Regained, the visions of Emanuel Swedenborg and the near-cabalistic writings of Jakob Böhme. Blake also included his own interpretations of druidism and paganism.

== The Fall of Albion ==
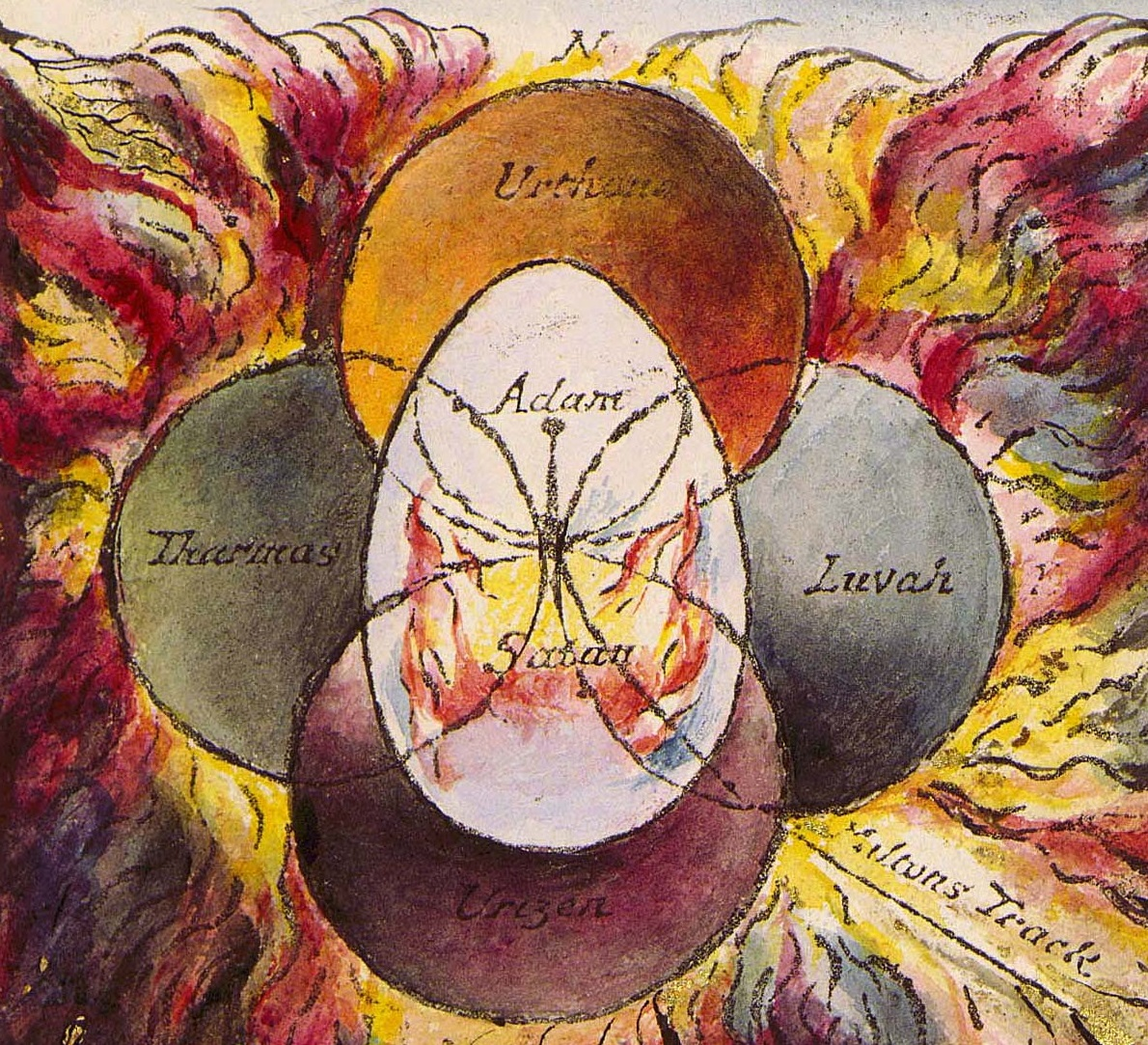
The relationship of the four Zoas, as depicted by Blake in Milton a Poem

The longest elaboration of this private myth-cycle was also his longest poem, The Four Zoas: The Death and Judgment of Albion The Ancient Man, written in the late 1790s but left in manuscript form at the time of his death. In this work, Blake traces the fall of Albion, who was "originally fourfold but was self-divided". This theme was revisited later, more definitively but perhaps less directly, in his other epic prophetic works, Milton: A Poem and Jerusalem: The Emanation of the Giant Albion.

The parts into which Albion is divided are the four Zoas:

- Tharmas: representing instinct and strength.
- Urizen: reason and conventional society; a cruel god resembling the Gnostic Demiurge.
- Luvah: love, passion and emotive faculties; a Christ-like figure, also known as Orc in his most amorous and rebellious form.
- Urthona, also known as Los: inspiration and the imagination.

The Blake pantheon also includes feminine emanations that have separated from an integrated male being, as Eve separated from Adam:

- The sexual Enion is an emanation from Tharmas.
- The intellectual Ahania is an emanation from Urizen.
- The nature goddess Vala is an emanation from Luvah (Orc).
- The musical Enitharmon is an emanation from Los (Urthona).

The fall of Albion and his division into the Zoas and their emanations are also the central themes of Jerusalem The Emanation of the Giant Albion.

Rintrah first appears in The Marriage of Heaven and Hell, personifying revolutionary wrath. He is later grouped together with other spirits of rebellion in the Visions of the Daughters of Albion:

- The loud and lustful Bromion.
- The "mild and piteous" Palamabron, son of Enitharmon and Los (also appears in Milton).
- The tortured mercenary Theotormon.
