= Albion (Blake) =

Primeval man in the mythology of William Blake

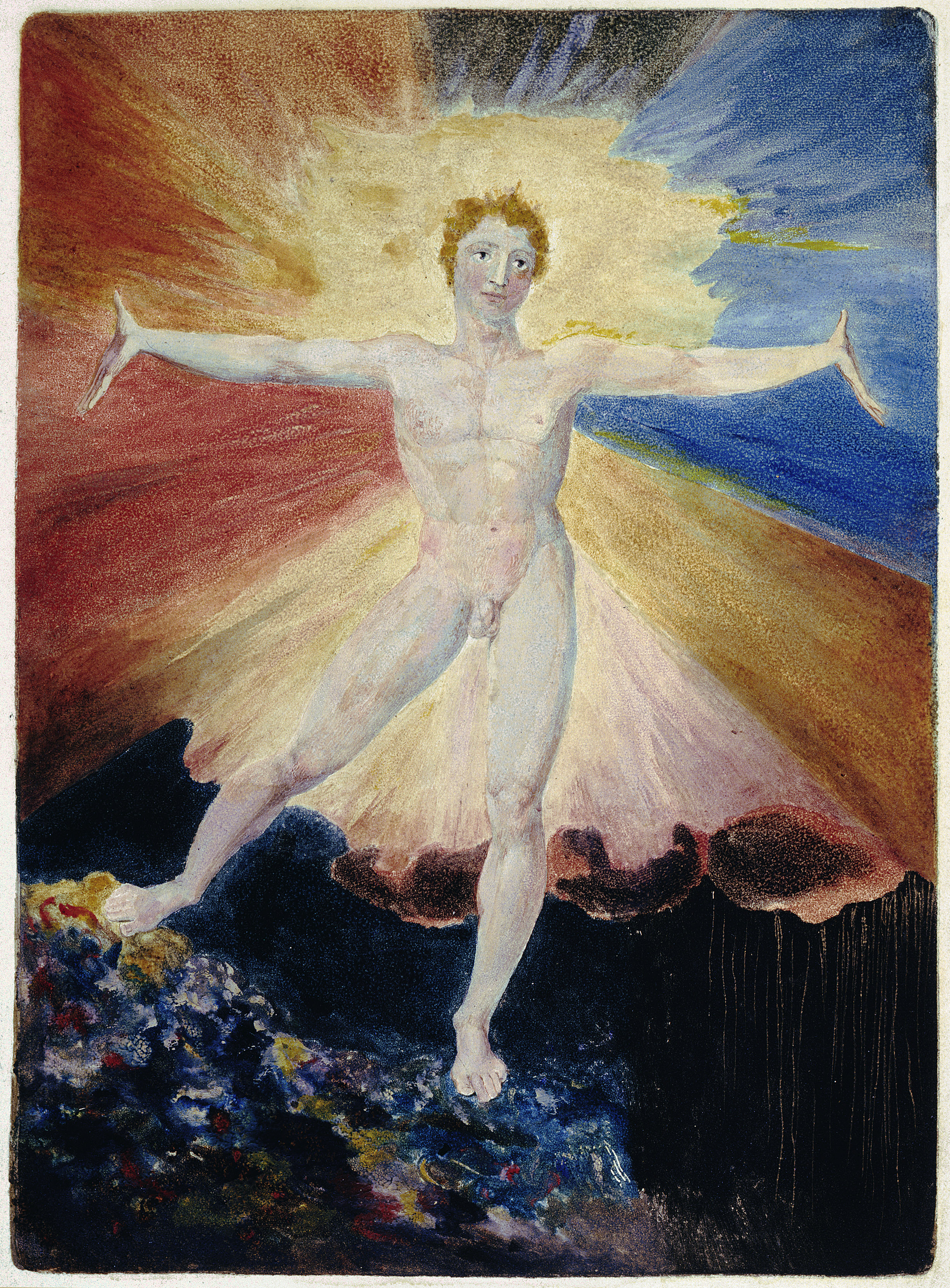
Blake's image of Albion from his A Large Book of Designs

In the mythology of William Blake, Albion is the primeval man whose fall and division results in the Four Zoas: Urizen, Tharmas, Luvah/Orc and Urthona/Los.

The name derives from the ancient and mythological name of Britain, Albion.

== Sources ==
In the mythical story of the founding of Britain, Albion was a giant and a son of Poseidon, the Greek god of the sea. He was a contemporary of Heracles, who killed him. Albion founded a country on the island and ruled there. Britain, then called Albion after its founder, was inhabited by his Giant descendants until about 1100 years before Julius Cæsar's invasion of Britain, when Brutus of Troy came and defeated the small number of Giants that remained (as a group of the Giants had killed all the others).

According to another account, Noah's son Japhet had a son named Histion, who had four sons. Their names were Francus, Romanus, Brittos and Alemannus, and the French, Roman, British and German people are descended from them. Brittos divided Britain into three kingdoms and gave each to one of his sons. They were Loegria (a Latinization of the Welsh Lloegyr), Scotland and Cambria. The division of the primordial man is found in many mythic and mystic systems throughout the world, including Adam Kadmon in Kabbalah and Prajapati in the Rigveda.

== Usage ==
The long, unfinished poem properly called Vala, or The Four Zoas expands the significance of the Zoas, but they are integral to all of Blake's prophetic books.

Blake's painting of a naked figure raising his arms, loosely based on Vitruvian Man, is now identified as a portrayal of Albion, following the discovery of a printed version with an inscription identifying the figure. It was formerly known as "Glad Day", since it was assumed by Alexander Gilchrist to illustrate a quotation from Shakespeare.

Blake also uses the name Albion in its traditional meaning, as an ancient synonym for Britain, in his poem "A Little Boy Lost" in Songs of Experience. The poem tells about a young boy who, using reason, realizes that humans are selfish, and that "naught loves another as itself". He asks the priest: "Father, how can I love you / or any of my brothers more? / I love you like the little bird / That picks up crumbs around the door". The priest accuses the boy of blasphemy, and burns him "in a holy place / where many had been burned before". Blake concludes the poem by asking: "Are such things done on Albion's shore"

== Children ==
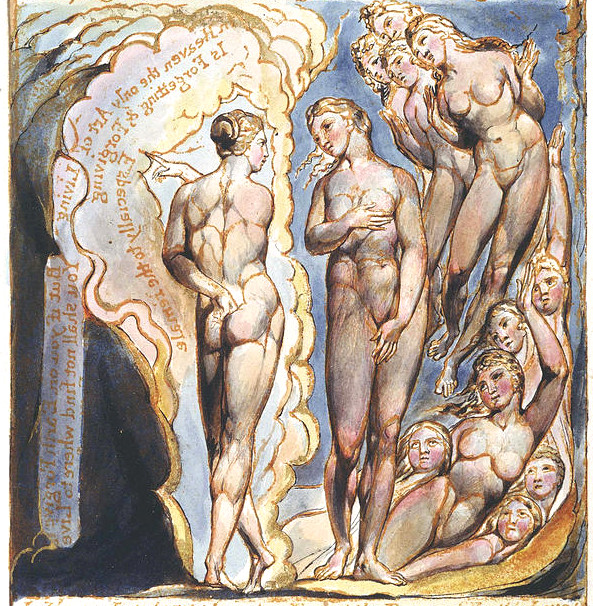
12 Daughters of Albion; in front Gwendolen (left) and Cambel (right). Jerusalem? Plate 81 (detail)

The Sons of Albion feature in the poem Jerusalem. They are 12, and are named as Hand, Hyle, Coban, Guantok, Peachey, Brereton, Slayd, Hutton, Scofield, Kox, Kotope, Bowen. These names are mostly drawn from figures from Blake's 1803 sedition trial.

The Daughters of Albion feature in Visions of the Daughters of Albion, and other prophetic books. They are named, not consistently though, in The Four Zoas and in Jerusalem:

1. Gwendolen
2. Ragan
3. Sabrina
4. Gonorill
5. Mehetabel
6. Cordella
7. Boadicea/Gwiniverra
8. Conwenna
9. Estrild
10. Gwinefrid
11. Ignoge
12. Cambel

Gwiniverra has replaced Boadicea, who is later equated with Cambel. They are mostly drawn from Geoffrey of Monmouth's Historia Regum Britanniae and John Milton's The History of Britain.

== See also ==
- Alebion – Ancient Greek mythological figure
- 15760 Albion – Trans-Neptunian object, prototype of cubewanos, minor planet
