= Thomas Butts =

British patron of art (1759–1846)

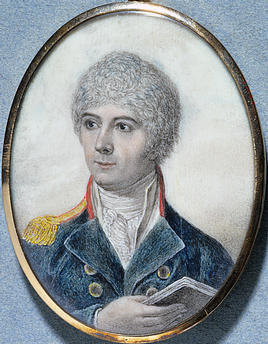
- Thomas Butts c.1801, watercolour on ivory by William Blake, in the British Museum
- Born: 1757
- Died: 1845 (aged 87–88)

Thomas Butts (1757–1845) was an English senior civil servant, and the leading patron to the artist and poet William Blake.

== Early life and family ==
Thomas Butts was born in 1757 to Thomas Butts and Hannah Witham. He married Elizabeth Mary Cooper (1754–1825), who was a schoolmistress. They lived at number 9, Great Marlborough Street, Soho, London. Their great-granddaughter was the modernist writer Mary Butts (1890–1937).

== Career ==
Butts was Assistant Commissary of Musters, and chief clerk to the Commissary General of Musters.

Butts and William Blake first met in about 1799, and he regularly advanced Blake money to pay for future work. Blake taught engraving to Butts' son. Blake created a number of miniatures of the Butts family during the period from about 1801 to 1809, and these are in the collection of the British Museum. The patronage reduced from about 1816, although Butts purchased a set of the Job engravings in 1825, and in 1827 was a subscriber for the Dante engravings.
