= Tharmas =

One of the four Zoas in the mythological writings of William Blake

In the mythological writings of William Blake, Tharmas is one of the four Zoas, who were created when Albion, the primordial man, was divided fourfold. He represents sensation, and his female counterpart is Enion, who represents sexual urges. He is connected to the God the Father aspect of the Christian Trinity and is the begetter of Los. Tharmas is mostly peaceful, and flees during most of his fights with Urizen. He is depicted in various ways ranging from a youth with wings to an old bearded man.

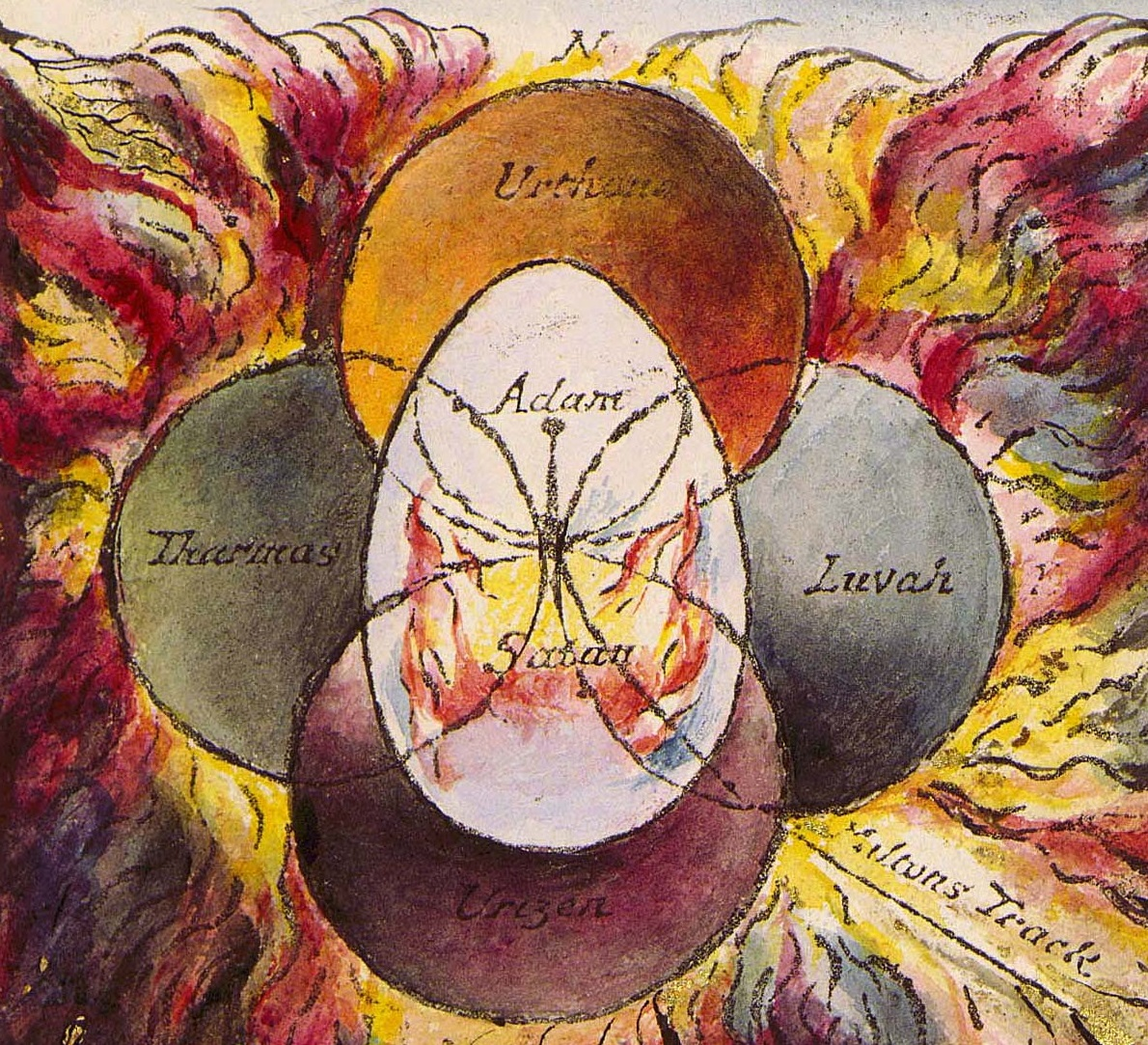
An illustration of the relationship of the Four Zoas from one of Blake's other works: Milton a Poem

== Character ==
Tharmas is both the last Zoas described but also the first in the number. His aspect as a Zoas is Sensation. As connected to the Trinity, Tharmas is seen as God the Father. As a body part, he is the loins with his Emanation/mate Enion representing sexual urges. He is also represented as a shepherd. Tharmas is connected to the direction point West and his fallen state is to mark the Circumference of the world. His elemental connection is to water and, in turn, to time. His artistic aspect is Painting and his particular sense is Tongue, which represents taste and speech. He represents both free speech but also false speech. In his divine state, Tharmas is peaceful and idyllic. However, during the war among the Zoas, he fights until he is defeated and falls. His name is possibly a back formation from their daughter's name, Enitharmon. Tharmas is the unifier of the Four Zoas. When Tharmas vanishes, he is replaced by chaotic nature.

As connected to the body and sensation, his fallen state's separation from Enion/sex causes him to turn into the spectre Eternal Death. Through Enion, he creates poetic instinct along with the children forms of Urthona/Los and Enitharmon. When separated from Enion, she creates the "Circle of Destiny", and, with it, the Gate of the tongue, which Tharmas is connected to, was closed. He is at conflict with himself, and through the conflict he becomes human. This caused him to hate, and he feels thwarted by being unable to have sex. He seeks out Urthona/Los and Enitharmon to redeem the universe, but Los refuses and Tharmas separates Urthona/Los and Enitharmon, which causes Urthona to become the spectre Los. However, he soon reunites them. Tharmas battles against Urizen, but normally ends up fleeing. During the Last Judgment, Tharmas and Enion are seen as two children and are able to experience an idealistic sexual relationship. They are also able to assume their divine forms and Tharmas awakens both Los the Eternal Prophet and Albion the Eternal Man. They join in with the harvest after the Final Judgment.

== Appearances ==
As part of Blake's later myth, Tharmas appears in Milton with a description of Tharmas relationship with Los and the building of Golgonooza. Tharmas creates the foundation but leaves as Los sets about rebuilding the universe. The Four Zoas describes Tharmas's disputes with Urizen and Tharmas constant fleeing from various fights. The work also reveals his origins along with his role within the Last Judgment. Jerusalem defines other aspects of Tharmas, including his connection to the tongue and speech. Tharmas also assumes many forms in Blake's various designs and illustrations. He is depicted in the designs as a young, winged man that lies near the Sea of Time and Space. He is in despair. The designs depicting him in Jerusalem show a bearded man that is shaping the circumference of a sphere while Enion is chasing after the young Los and Enitharmon. In the "Circle of Life" design, he is young and without a beard, and, in Blake's illustrations of Genesis, he has the head of an ox.
