= Los (Blake) =

Fallen form of Urthona in the mythological writings of William Blake

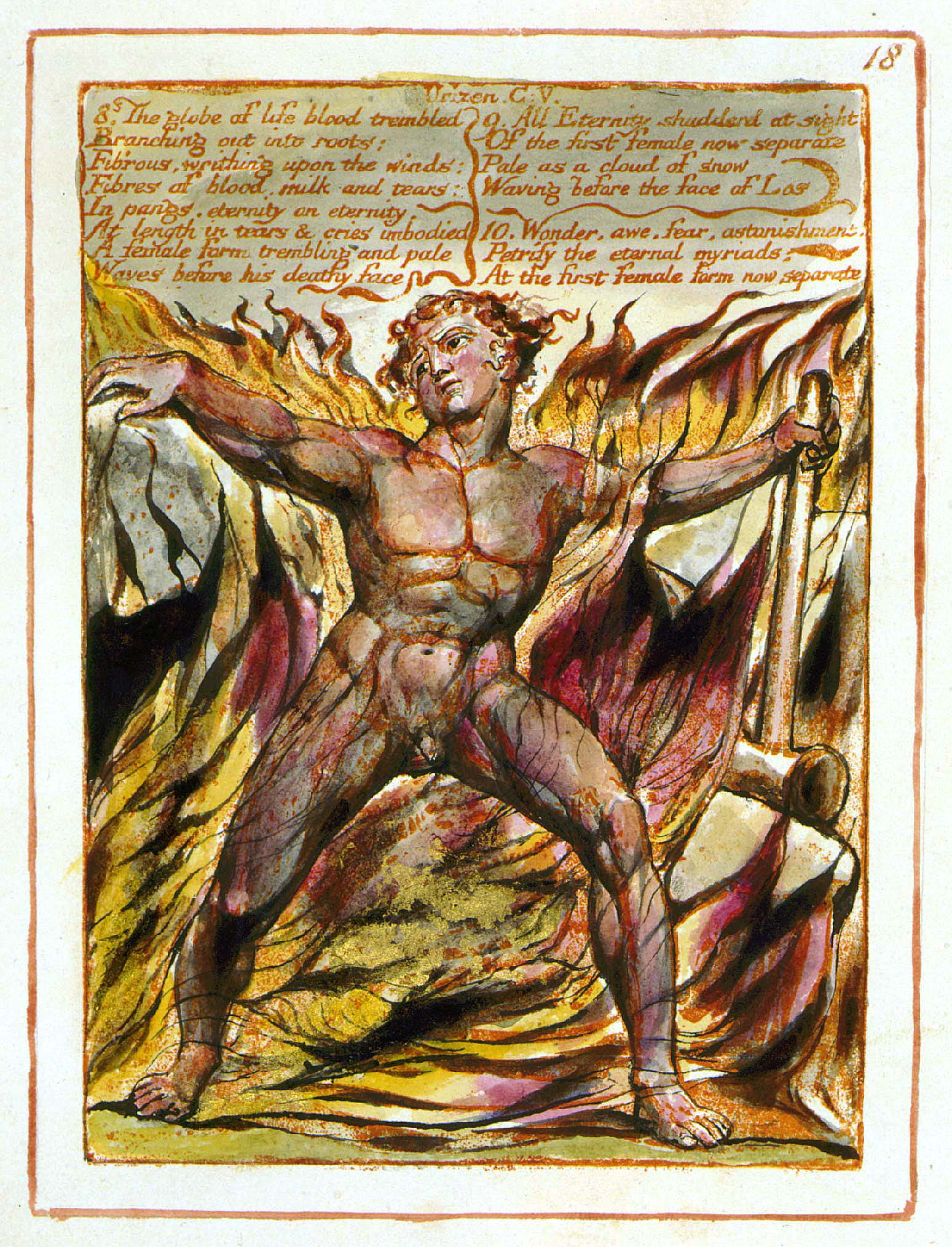
Los, as depicted in The Book of Urizen, copy G, in the collection of the Library of Congress

In the mythological writings of William Blake, Los is the fallen (earthly or human) form of Urthona, one of the four Zoas, and the embodiment of human creativity and inspiration. He is referred to as the "eternal prophet" and creates the visionary city of Golgonooza. Los is regularly described as a smith, beating with his hammer on a forge, which is metaphorically connected to the beating of the human heart. The bellows of his forge are the human lungs. Los's emanation, Enitharmon, represents spiritual beauty and embodies pity, but at the same time creates the spatial aspect of the fallen world, weaving bodies for men and creating sexual strife through her insistence upon chastity. In the Book of Urizen (1794), Los and Enitharmon have a child, Orc, who is the embodiment of the spirit of revolution. The name Los is, by common critical acceptance, an anagram of Sol, the Latin word for "sun". Los is also the plural form of the Spanish masculine definite object marker el, and El is a generic name for a god in biblical Hebrew and related languages. Such innovations are common in many of Blake's prophetic poems.

== Background ==
Blake attributed the origin of Los and many of his prophetic works to his home in Lambeth: "Los descended to me... trembling I stood... in the Vale of Lambeth; but he kissed me and wished me health".

== Character ==
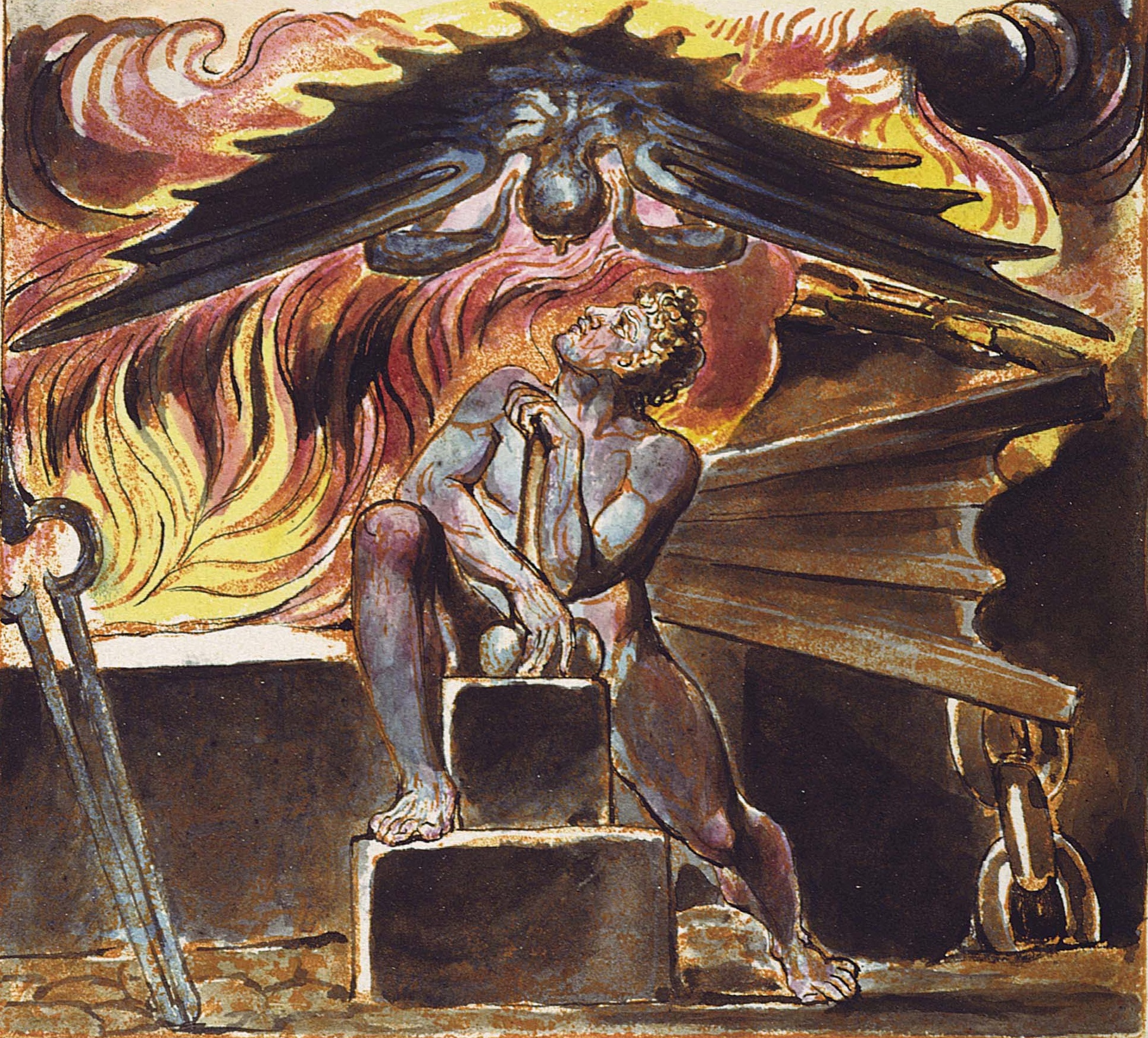
Los's Spectre torments him at his smithy in Jerusalem. This image comes from Copy E. of the work, printed in 1821 and in the collection of the Yale Center for British Art

Los is the divine aspect of the imagination. After he becomes more mechanical and regular in his actions, he falls and becomes part of the material world. In the fallen state, he becomes the creator of life and of organic systems. He also creates reproduction and the sexes, with his own partner Enitharmon soon after being created. He then creates consciousness through evolution, which leads to the creation of humans. Los is particularly focused on humans and he uses them to breed art and use their imaginations. Eventually, it is through the evolutions of the world that Orc is formed. Like Orc and Orc's cycles, Los is part of cycles as he tries to create the Golgonooza at the beginning of time and the image appears constantly in art. Los's imagination is also connected to the natural cycle, and art within the individual is developed through natural cycles. Art is mimetic of nature but order within nature. Los represents the progression through life to the conscious state.

== Appearances ==
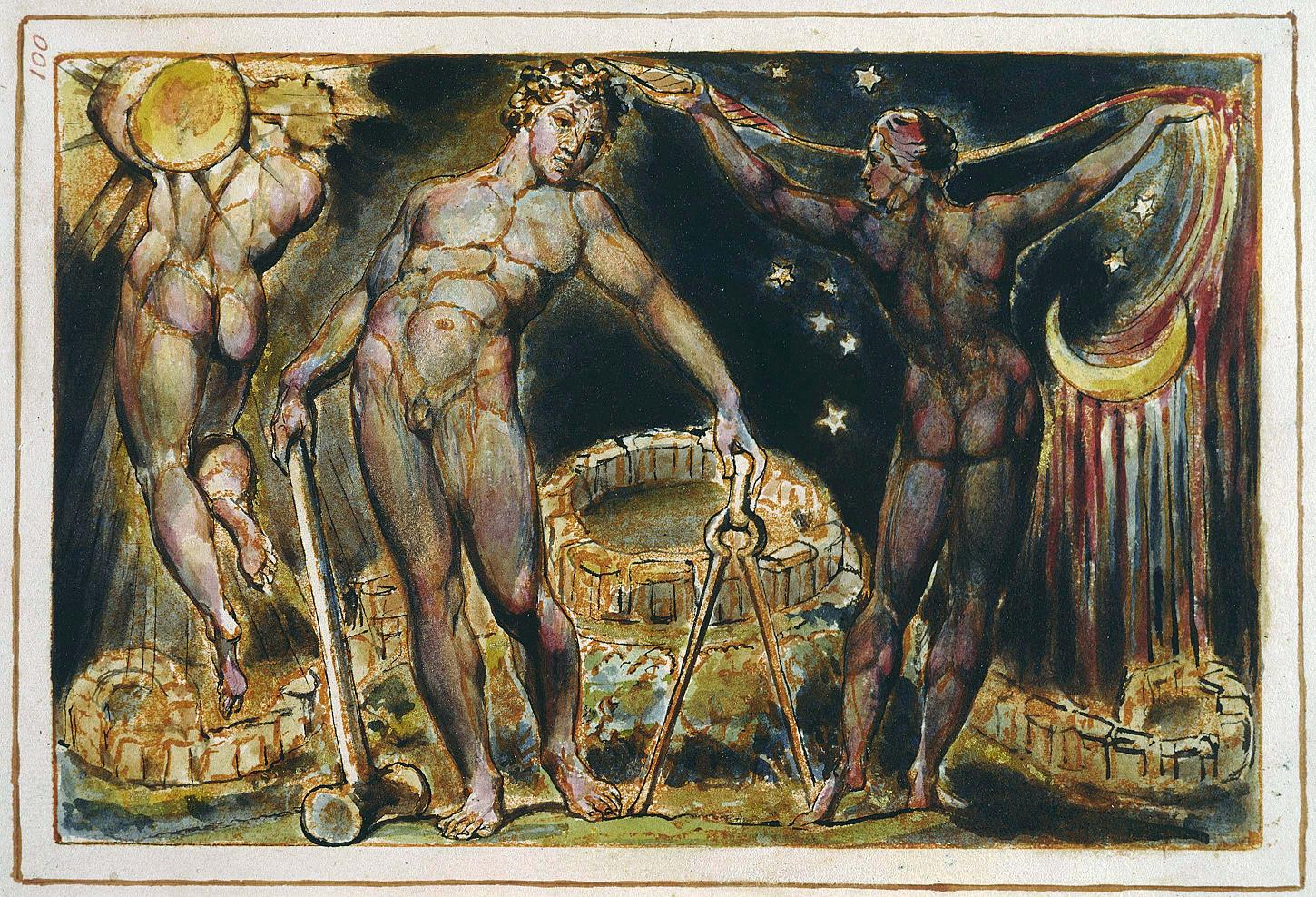
Two forms of Los with Enitharmon, Plate 100 of Jerusalem

Los appears in The Book of Urizen (1794) as an eternal prophet that binds Urizen after Urizen, the creator of the world suffers from a spiritual fall. He appears in the connected works The Song of Los, America a Prophecy and Europe a Prophecy at the same time. In these works, he begins as a prophet in Africa that describes how Urizen gave laws to the people that bound the minds of mankind. This was accomplished through Los's children with Enitharmon: "Thus the terrible race of Los & Enitharmon gave / Laws & Religions to the sons of Har binding them more / And more to Earth: closing and restraining" (lines 44–46).

The Book of Los, completed at the same time, continues from the story of The Book of Urizen and describes how Los fell and was bound in a human form. It also describes how Los, in turn, bound Urizen in a human form. In The Book of Urizen, Los is constantly at struggle with Urizen to control the world and the two represent opposites. However, this was to later change when Blake added two other beings in his later work. In the early works, however, the binary system is possibly similar to the imaginative and reason sides that Blake divided his own mind and a struggle between the two. He also felt that Los was closely connected to Christ, and that is why Los dominated within his myth.

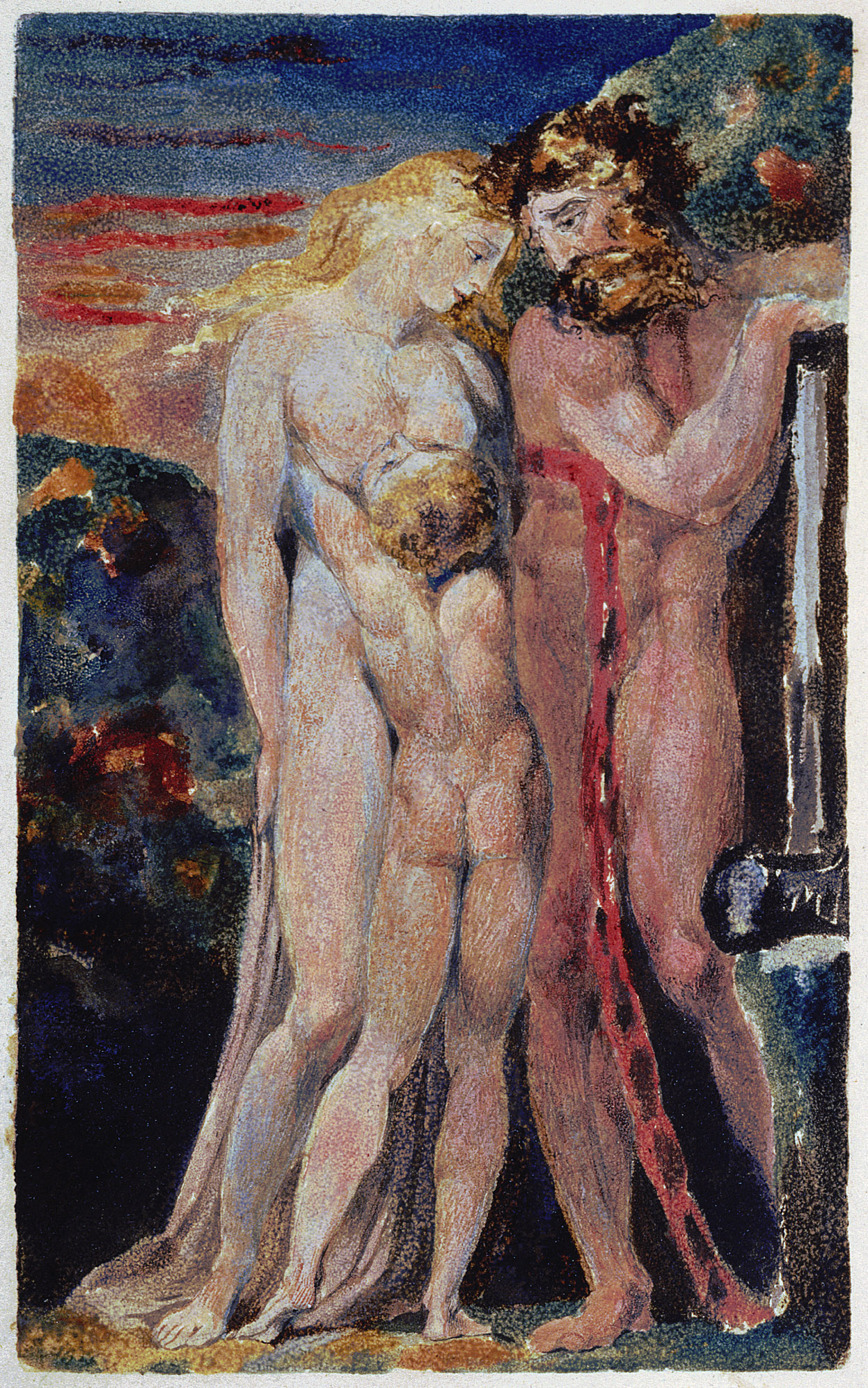
Los with the child Orc and Enitharmon, in Blake's A Large Book of Designs. Produced c. 1796, this print is copy A of object 2 in the copy currently held by the British Museum.

In Jerusalem (1804–1820), it is said that Los was the progenitor of Adam, Noah, Abraham, Moses, and the other Biblical spiritual leaders. The work also describes the Four Zoas that are four parts that were united in Eternity but exist in a state similar to a giant after their fall. These four parts include Los and Urizen along with Tharmas and Luvah. The Four Zoas appear also in 2nd edition of Vala, or the Four Zoas (1807) and Milton: a Poem. In Milton: a Poem (1804–1810), Los appears as a flaming sun. This view of Los and the sun is similar to a description in a poem that Blake included in a letter (22 November 1802) that he wrote to Thomas Butts, and he believed that in the vision he was able to unite with Los. In Vala, or the Four Zoas, Los witnesses a vision of the Lamb of God being sacrificed to reveal his spiritual side while Urizen and the Synagogue of Satan work against Christ and are the ones who condemn him to death. After the Synagogue of Satan promotes Deism, Los seizes the sun and the moon and breaks apart the heavens. The destruction of the world leads to eternity and the second judgment unfolds. The poem ends with Urthona, Los's unfallen state rising up and shepherding in science and removing the dark religions.

The final version of Jerusalem, completed by 1820, was a Gospel about the imagination as God's presence within humanity, and the messiah figure of the work is Los. Los's purpose was to create his own system in order to be free of any other system, and this system would be based on creation instead of reason. The purpose of the work is to describe Los's triumph and the new apocalypse in which the Lamb of God comes to England to rule.

== In later literature ==
In Ray Nelson's Science Fiction novel "Blake's Progress", based on the assumption that the poet William Blake and his wife Kate were time travelers, it is assumed that in fact Los was the poet Milton, a fellow time traveler.
