= Emanationism =

Belief that all things derive from a first reality

Emanationism is a theory in the cosmology or cosmogony of certain religious and philosophical systems, that posits the concept of emanation. According to this theory, emanation, from the Latin emanare meaning "to flow from" or "to pour forth or out of", is the mode by which all existing things are derived from a 'first reality', or first principle.

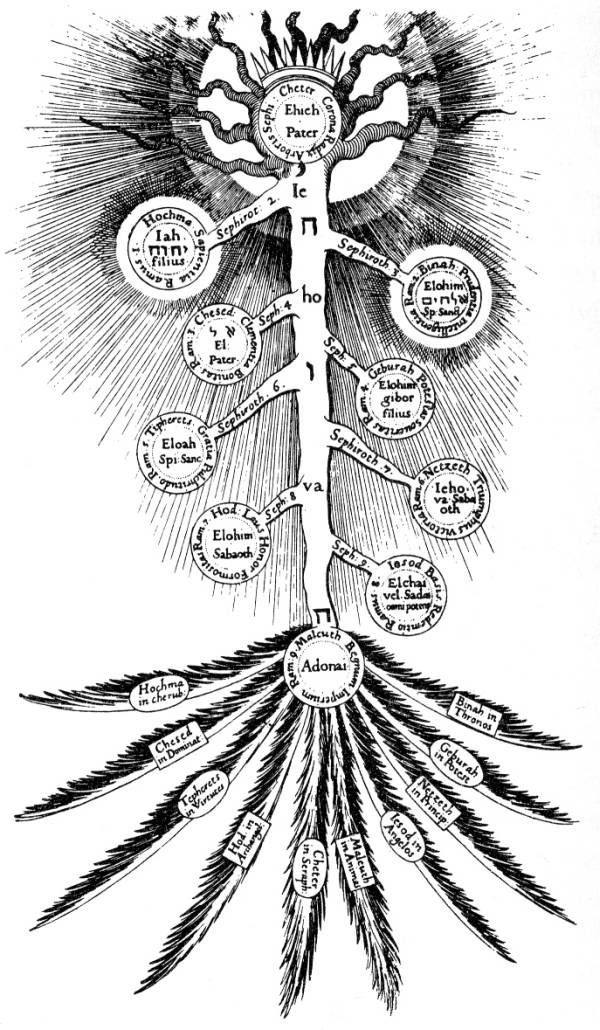
One depiction of the Kabbalistic tree of life with the Sefirot (emanations) labeled in relation to God

In the emanationist concept all things are derived from this first reality or perfect God, by consecutive steps of degradation, to a lower degree of this first reality or God: at every consecutive step the emanating beings are less pure, less perfect, less divine. Emanationism posits a transcendent principle from which everything is derived, as opposed to creationism, that considers the universe to be created by a sentient God who is separate from creation, and to materialism, which posits no underlying subjective and/or ontological nature behind phenomena, all phenomena being considered immanent.

== Origins ==
The primary classical exponent of emanationism was the neoplatonic philosopher Plotinus, who in his Enneads described all things phenomenal and otherwise as an emanation (Greek: ἀπορροή aporrhoe (Ennead ΙΙ.3.2) or ἀπόρροια aporrhoia (II.3.11)) from the One (ἕν, hen). In 5.1.6, emanationism is compared to a diffusion from the One, of which there are three primary hypostases, the One, the Intellect (νοῦς, nous), and the Soul (ψυχή, psyche).

== In religion ==
Emanationism also exists in Zoroastrianism and Hinduism, where it may have initially been unrelated to the Greek philosophy. In Zoroastrianism the Amesha Spenta are emanations of Ahura Mazda. Spenta Mainyu (Creative Emanation or Holy Spirit) is one of the most important of these, is immanent, and is how Ahura Mazda interacts with the world.

Emanationism was introduced to many Muslims and Jews in the medieval era, where it became popular with some mystics, such as Bahya ibn Paquda and ibn Gabriol (both Sufi influenced Jews). While emanationism struggled with some Jewish philosophers, it became a major part of Kabbalaistic thought.

While definitely popularized in the Medieval era, it is possible the first known instance of emanationism in Judaism comes from the Sefer Yetzirah, which likely comes from the Talmudic era (70-640 CE). The Sefer Yetzirah has some features characteristic of a 3rd-4th century authorship, and uses several concepts which are clearly Hellenic in origin. The Sefer Yetzirah was later adopted by Kabbalists, though the text itself utilizes the concept of emanationism differently.

In Islam, emanations are called "fayd", and are often understood as an act of free will that is constantly ongoing. This view has been criticized as reducing God's role in creation to the level of natural causality.

Some early Christians believed in emanationism, though ultimately the philosophy did not take hold as a standard church doctrine. The idea did, however, become a common part of Gnosticism. It and related ideas did continue to be expressed by some Christians, such as Gregory Palamas, who drew a distinction between God's essence and energies, and Nikitas Stithatos, who was a proponent of a divine decad that has similarities to the Sefirot.

Emanationism has some currency in Buddhism, though is not typically used to explain the creation of this world or this universe. Instead, Buddhas and other powerful and near-enlightened beings have the ability to create emanations from themselves, where they can exist as a consciousness in multiple forms (including potentially infinite forms). However, some Buddhists (especially those affiliated with Dzogchen) view emanations in a more general sense, with beings emanating from the "Primidorial Ground". Other Mahayana texts espouse similar ideas, such as a One Mind (identical with Suchness and Buddhahood) which a transcendent principle that serves as the "ontological ground" that makes it possible for other beings to exist.

Some Hindus believe in a Supreme Being which the other gods are emanations of. Which being this is changes based on sect. This may extend to the rest of existence as well.

Adherents to Slavic Native Faith (Rodnovery) sometimes believe in emanationism, with the god Rod being the principle source of reality. All other gods are seen as coming from one ultimate god, a view based on historical sources and linguistic analysis. All phenomena and beings in turn, are seen as emanations of the gods that emanate from Rod. This sometimes expressed as the axiom "we are not God's slaves, but God's sons".

== See also ==
- Aeon – Class of being in Gnosticism
- Atziluth
- Anathem – 2008 science fiction novel by Neal Stephenson
- Emanation in the Eastern Orthodox Church – Neoplatonic belief
- Jerusalem: The Emanation of the Giant Albion – Prophetic book by William Blake
- Monism
- Panentheism – Belief that the divine pervades all of space and time and also extends beyond it
