= Leutha =

Female character appearing in the mythology of William Blake

Leutha is a female character appearing in the mythology of William Blake. According to S. Foster Damon, A Blake Dictionary, she stands for 'sex under law'.

== Incidence ==
Leutha is mentioned in

- Visions of the Daughters of Albion
- The Book of Los
- Europe a Prophecy
- America a Prophecy
- Milton
- Vala, or The Four Zoas
- Jerusalem: The Emanation of the Giant Albion

== Relationships ==
In Milton

But when Leutha (a Daughter of Beulah) beheld Satans condemnation
She down descended into the midst of the Great Solemn Assembly
"Offering herself a Ransom for Satan, taking on her, his Sin."

Whence the interpretation commonly given as guilt, and in particularly sexual guilt.

== Locality ==
In the poem Jerusalem: The Emanation of the Giant Albion Chapter II by William Blake, Leutha is associated with the Isle of Dogs:

He came down from Highgate thro' Hackney & Holloway towards London
Till he came to old Stratford, & thence to Stepney & the Isle
Of Leuthas Dogs, thence thro' the narrows of the River's side,
And saw every minute particular, the jewels of Albion, running down
The kennels of the streets and lanes as if they were abhorr'd
Every Universal Form was become barren mountains of moral
Virtue, and every Minute Particular harden'd into grains of sand
And all the tendernesses of the soul cast forth as filth and mire.

== Name ==
The homophone relationship to Martin Luther has often been pointed out. Angela Esterhammer (Blake and Language p. 73, in William Blake Studies (2006), edited by Nicholas M. Williams) writes:

Blake's Leutha represents 'Protestant speech' — an association achieved partly through the pun on 'Luther', but mainly through her own verbal behaviours in Blake's prophetic poems, where she manifests 'Protestant' modes of speech such as public self-scrutiny, self-exaggeration, confession, and plain-spokenness.
