= French River =

French River may refer to:

== Rivers ==
- French River (Ontario), Canada
- French River (Massachusetts), United States
- French River (Minnesota)
- Any river within the country of France; see List of rivers of France
- A river in the eastern part of Quetico Provincial Park in Ontario, Canada

== Other places ==
- French River, Colchester County, a community in Nova Scotia, Canada
- French River, Minnesota, an unincorporated community in the United States
- French River, Nova Scotia (disambiguation), 3 locations in Nova Scotia
- French River, Ontario, a municipality in Canada
- French River 13, Ontario, a First Nations reserve
- French River, Pictou County, a community in Nova Scotia, Canada
- French River, Prince Edward Island

== See also ==
- French Broad River, a river in the southeastern United States
- French Creek, New York
- French Creek (Allegheny River tributary)
- French (disambiguation)
