= French =

French may refer to:

- Something of, from, or related to France, including:
  - French language, which originated in France
  - French people, individuals identified with France
  - French cuisine, cooking traditions and practices

French may also refer to:

== Arts and media ==
- The French (band), a British rock band
- "French" (episode), a live-action episode of The Super Mario Bros. Super Show!
- French Stewart (born 1964), American actor

== Other uses ==
- French (surname), including a list of people with the name
- French (tunic), a type of military jacket or tunic
- French's, an American brand of mustard condiment
- French (catheter scale), a unit of measurement
- French Defence, a chess opening
- French kiss, a type of kiss

== See also ==
- Français (disambiguation), for français and française
- France (disambiguation)
- Franch, a surname
- French Revolution (disambiguation)
- French River (disambiguation), several rivers and other places
- Frenching (disambiguation)
- Justice French (disambiguation)
