= French River, Nova Scotia =

French River, Nova Scotia may refer to:

- French River, Colchester County
- French River, Pictou County
- French River, Victoria, Nova Scotia
