= Archives of the University of Glasgow =

Archive in Glasgow, Scotland

Coordinates: 55.869°N 4.297°W

13 Thurso Street.

The University of Glasgow Archives & Special Collections (ASC) is a part of University Services.

Archives & Special Collections maintain the historical records of the University of Glasgow back to its foundation in 1451. Its earliest record is a charter dating from 1304 for the lands of the earliest mention of record-keeping in the university is in 1490 when it is recorded in the Annales Universitatis Glasguensis 1451–1558 that "in accordance with a proposition of the Lord Rector, a parchment book is ordered to be procured, in which important writs, statutes, and lists of the university, are to be engrossed: and also a paper book, for recording judicial proceedings." The Clerk to the Faculty, and subsequently the Clerk of Senate, maintained the records of the university due to the continuing requirement to ensure that the privileges, rights, policies and finances of the university were kept in good order.

Previously considered two distinct departments of "Archive Services" and "Special Collections", the department is now known as "Archives & Special Collections".

Today, their activities are based between their sites at 13 Thurso Street, and on Level 12 of the University Library. Collections held by Archives & Special Collections include: The University Archives, Manuscripts, the Scottish Business Archive, the Scottish Theatre Archive, as well as Rare Books and the House of Fraser Archive.

== Services ==
=== Reading Room service ===
Items held by Archives & Special Collections are accessible to students, researchers and the general public via appointment made through the Archives & Special Collections website.

13 Thurso Street Reading Room.

Reading Room services are available at two locations - On Level 12 of the University Library, and at 13 Thurso Street.

University of Glasgow Archives & Special Collections also offers virtual reading room services if you are unable to visit in-person.

=== Enquiry service ===
Archives & Special Collections can answer enquiries about their collections and about the history of the University.

Users can make a general enquiry about the University collections or undertake an ancestor enquiry with the help of Archives & Special Collections to receive details about their ancestors who may have studied at University of Glasgow.

Users can also search for details of graduates of the University up to 1921 through the University of Glasgow Story website.

== Collections ==

=== Rare books ===
The collection of rare books held in the archive comprises over 10,000 works, most of which were printed before 1800. The collections have been acquired and kept by the University of Glasgow since it was established in 1451 and includes over two thousand years of literature, such as 19th-century colour plate books and works stemming from private presses.

==== Featured collections ====
- The Hunterian Library Collection is one of the finest 18th century libraries to survive intact. It comprises 10,000 printed books and 650 manuscripts, 532 incunabula (amongst them ten Caxtons) and over 2,300 volumes with 16th-century imprints assembled by Dr William Hunter (1718-83). About one third of Hunter's books are related to medicine, especially in fields of Anatomy and Obstetrics. The collection also includes the working papers of his mentor, James Douglas and also a large corpus of Hunter's own papers representing his research in anatomy and medicine.
- Whistler Archive is the largest collection of correspondences and papers of the 19th century artist James McNeill Whistler. Most of this archive was donated to the University of Glasgow by Miss Rosalind Birnie Philip (1873-1958), Whistler's sister-in-law, and inheritor of his estate.
- The Ferguson Collection consists of around 7,500 volumes belonging to John Ferguson, a bibliographer and Regius Professor of Chemistry at the University of Glasgow from 1874 to 1915. Most of the collections are in fields of alchemy and chemistry, as well as more niche areas such as books of secrets, the occult sciences and witchcraft, Cabbalism, Rosicrucianism, Free Masonry and Gypsy literature.
- The Euing Collection comprises 12,000 books from the library of William Euing, an insurance broker local to Glasgow in the 19th century. The collection is divided into three parts: a general collection of 7,000 volumes; a collection of 3000 bibles, psalters, books of prayers and hymns amounting to; and a collection of 2,500 volumes of early printed music. Each segment of the collection includes several incunabula, with the general collection holding 130, the biblical collection holding 24, and the musical collection holding 7.
- The Dougan Collection showcases the development of photography from the 1840s to the early 20th century. It includes 468 salted paper prints and 490 calotype negatives produced in the 1840s by the pioneering Scottish photographic partnership of David Octavius Hill and Robert Adamson. Douglas also possessed at least 100 photography albums, which included both works by significant professionals as well as amateur pieces.

==== Featured items ====
- The University's copy of a Shakespearean First Folio, published in 1623.
- William Blake's illuminated text, Europe: a Prophecy, the second of his Continental prophecies created in 1794 and one of only ten surviving copies.
- Greek Papyrus Fragments from Oxyrhynchus- The complete set of fragments donated to Glasgow University Library by the Egypt Exploration Fund between 1901 and 1924.
- Mozart's penultimate letter to his wife in Vienna, from 1791.

=== Manuscripts ===
The archive houses an extensive collection of rare and significant manuscripts, dating as far back as the medieval period, including illuminated medieval and renaissance manuscripts, but also personal correspondences, music scores, illustrations, early photographs, maps and ephemera.

The collection itself was acquired in 1451 at the beginning of the university's history, with a large number having stemmed from the personal collection of Dr William Hunter when it was bequeathed to the University of Glasgow in 1807, four years after his death.Hunter's collection contains around 650 manuscripts in total, with over 400 originating from the medieval or Renaissance periods. The collection includes over 100 international manuscripts, most of which being Persian or Arabic.

==== Featured Items ====
- The Hunterian Psalter, an illuminated manuscript depicting several scenes from the Old Testament as well as the life of Jesus Christ, thought to be created c. 1170. These illustrations, belonging in style to the 12th century Romanesque tradition, are thought to have been created with the intention of aiding reading comprehension of the Psalms for contemporary audiences.
- Ludolph of Saxony's Vita Christi, a 15th century French illuminated manuscript depicting the life of Jesus Christ. It comprises 4 volumes and around 140 illuminated miniatures. It was likely intended to act as a spiritual guide to living a holy life through prayer.
- The only surviving medieval manuscript text of Chaucer's Romaunt of the Rose, written c.1440. It is a middle English translation of the French allegory of love, Le Roman de la Rose, and has been ornately illustrated with floral motifs, though remains incomplete. The archive also has a completely digitised copy available in its digital collection.
- A series of anatomical red chalk illustrations by Jan van Rymsdyk, drawn for William Hunter's own "The anatomy of the human gravid uterus", written in 1774.

=== University Archives ===
Archives & Special Collections also holds the institutional records of the University of Glasgow itself, since its establishment in 1451. They are kept to provide a record of the intellectual history of Scotland, and include several different university-related documents donated by staff, alumni and associated organisations, as well as the records of predecessor institutions. The online catalogues allow for members of the public search for information on staff, alumni, and affiliated organizations.

==== Featured Collections ====
- Collecting COVID-19, an active collection focused on documenting the university's experience and response to the COVID-19 pandemic is preserved by the university archive, including items such as the university website, social-media, email communication to staff and students, online events and exam guidance. It is an incomplete, on-going collection.
- The University of Glasgow Blackhouse Charters, 1304 to 1717. These hold the oldest documents in the archive and illustrate the expansion and relocation of the University across time through its property records, court settlements, donations and royal grants.

The collection also provides documents relating to several research topics pertaining to the university's own history, including:

- Alumni societies
- Medical Humanities collections
- Important individuals associated with the University
- Predecessor and affiliated institutions
- Rectorial addresses.
- Student records
- Student societies
- The University of Glasgow itself
- War studies
- Women's history

=== Scottish Business Archives ===
The Scottish Business Archive held at the University of Glasgow holds records dating back to the 18^{th} century up to the present day. The Archive contains over 400 collections from various businesses across Scotland such as banking, confectioners, shipbuilding and textiles. The featured collections in this archive include the House of Fraser Archive, James Finlay & Co and Stoddard-Templeton.

==== Featured Collections ====
- Records of the textile industry in Scotland, comprising more than 130 collections. These records range from weaving and sewing taking place in the home to industrial scale textile production as well as records from needlework associations amongst others.
- The House of Fraser Archive, this part of the archive contains records regarding the history of the company and key people involved in the company. This can be accessed online through a research project launched in December of 2011.
- James Finlay & Co, this part of the archive contains records such as the Manager’s and Assistant’s letterbooks for the company.The company deals mainly in tea and the letterbooks contain information about the men recruited to manage the tea estates overseas.
- Shirlaw Allan, the University Archives hold the sale catalogues for Shirlaw Allan from 1882-1972. This company dealt with the sales of a wide range of industrial equipment.
- The Stoddard-Templeton Collection, this is a joint venture managed by the University of Glasgow, the Glasgow School of Art and Glasgow Life. This archive deals with the history and designs, as well as the heritage carpet collection of James Templeton & Co Ltd and Stoddard International plc.

=== Scottish Theatre Archive ===
The Scottish Theatre Archive is a part of University of Glasgow Archives & Special Collections. It was founded in 1981 with funding from the Scottish Arts Council and has been funded and staffed by the University Library since 1985. The archive broadly covers the traditional and the contemporary, the serious and the popular aspects of Scottish theatre.

The archives of the Citizens' Theatre, the National Theatre of Scotland, Scottish Ballet that includes material from its beginnings as the Western Theatre Ballet, the BBC Radio Scotland script collection, and the Jimmy Logan collection of music-hall material are among the largest collections that University holds. Other important collections include material relating to the Scottish Repertory Theatre, the Scottish National Players, the Royal Lyceum Theatre Edinburgh, Glasgow Unity, Molly Urquhart and her theatre, the Scottish Theatre Company, the Dundee Repertory Theatre, Wilson Barrett Company, Mayfest and the Edinburgh Festival Fringe.

The collections consist mostly of programmes, scripts, production notes, photographs, posters, and presscuttings. The archive is home to over 7000 playscripts, and an extensive collection of published play texts, and separate script collections, including those of John Cairney, Michael Elder, Robert Kemp, and the Scottish Society of Playwrights.

The cataloguing of archives is still in process. Therefore, enquiries should be made regarding availability of material in advance of any visit.

==== Featured Collections ====
- Record of correspondence, minutes, plans, photographs, presscuttings and programmes of Citizens theatre and other venues dating from the 19th century onwards.
- Collections of articles, brochures, leaflets, performance archive film (DVD), posters, presscuttings, programmes, prompt scripts and reviews of National Theatre of Scotland from 2006 onwards.
- Records of financial information, leaflets, photographs, programmes and posters from TAG Theatre Company, Scotland's oldest touring theatre company established in 1967, formerly known as the Citizens Theatre for Youth until its name change to TAG in the 1970s.
- Records of financial information, leaflets, photographs, posters, and programmes of 7:84 Theatre Company, founded in 1971 by playwright and director John McGrath with the intent to present the truth of working-class life and history to working class audiences in venues sidelined by established theatre companies. The company split in 1973 to form separate English and Scottish branches, and became a private limited company, 7:84 Theatre Company (Scotland) Ltd, in 1997.
- Collection of contracts, leaflets, presscuttings, posters, production photographs, scripts and over 600 programmes ranging from the 1920's to the late 1960's associated with Alhambra Theatre Glasgow.
- Records of correspondence, leaflets, photographs and programmes of Western Theatre Ballet. All other material including board papers and financial papers are held by Scottish Ballet at the Tramway Complex.
- Collection of board papers, correspondence of the Scottish Society of Playwrights and the Scottish Society of Playwrights Newsletter.
- Collection of programmes, photographs, posters and scripts of the Tron Theatre. This collection is partly catalogued.
