= French Revolution (disambiguation) =

The French Revolution (La Révolution Française) was a period of social radial and political society in France from 1789 to 1799.

French Revolution may also refer to:

- The French Revolution: A History, an 1837 book by Thomas Carlyle
- The French Revolution (poem), by William Blake, 1791
- The French Revolution (novel), by Matt Stewart, 2009
- La Révolution Française, a 1973 French rock opera
- La Révolution française (film), a two-part historical drama, 1989

== See also ==
- History of France
- Timeline of French history
- French Revolutionary Wars 1792–1802, resulting from the French Revolution
- July Revolution, or Second French Revolution, or the French Revolution of 1830
- French Revolution of 1848
- Révolution nationale, the ideological program of the Vichy regime in World War II
- Révolution (comic), about the events of the French Revolution
- French Revolutions, a book by Tim Moore about cycling
