= Franch =

Franch is a surname. Notable persons with that surname include:

- Adrianna Franch (born 1990), American football (soccer) player
- Josep Franch (born 1991), Spanish basketball player
- Pau Franch (born 1988), Spanish football (soccer) player
- Vicent Franch (born 1949), Spanish jurist, politologist, journalist and writer

== See also ==
- French (disambiguation)
- France
