= The French Revolution (poem) =

Poem by William Blake

- by William Blake
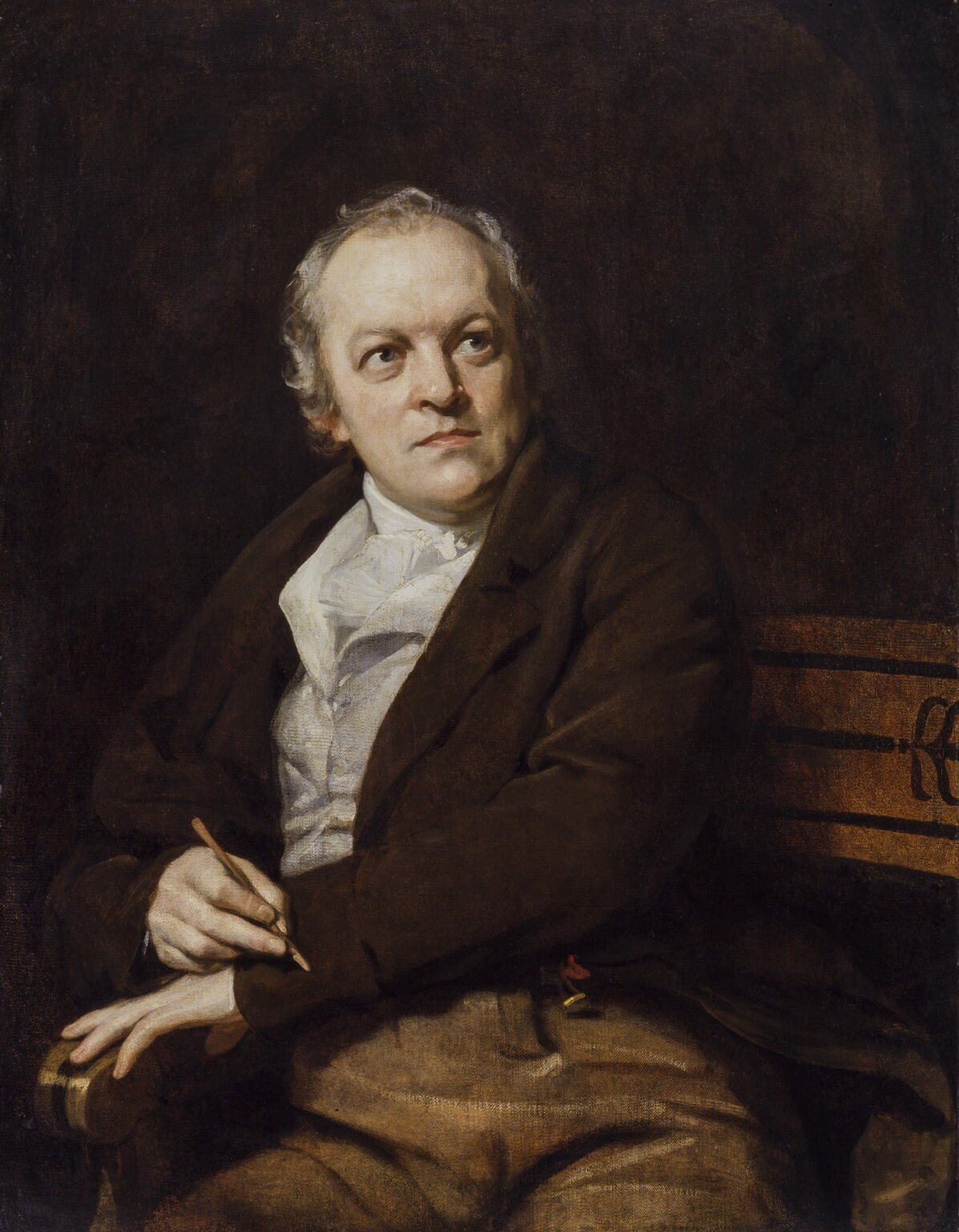

The French Revolution is a poem written by William Blake in 1791. It was intended to be seven books in length, but only one book survives. In that book, Blake describes the problems of the French monarchy and seeks the destruction of the Bastille in the name of Freedom.

== Background ==
Blake felt that there was a strong connection between the American and French Revolution and that these revolutions had a universal and historical impact. The French Revolution was intended as a poetic history of these current events in Blake's life and was supposed to be an account of Blake's understanding of the French Revolution described in seven books of poetry first published in 1791. Although Blake was not part of any radical political organizations in England at the time of the French Revolution, his works suggest a connection to revolutionary thought and the poem serves as his involvement in the debate over the merits of the French Revolution.

For reasons unknown, the project was abandoned before publication. The only pages that survived are the original proofs for the first book, which are now in the collection of the Huntington Library. Although it cannot be known why Johnson stopped printing Blake's poem, he did print other works by Blake including For Children and Songs of Innocence. The poem currently appears in only one proof copy, and there are few references to The French Revolution until the 20th century. One of these is from Samuel Palmer, a follower of Blake, who wrote on 10 October 1827 that he wished to find a copy of the poem. The other is from Alexander Gilchrist, an early biographer of Blake, who wrote on 24 November 1860 to John Linnell, a collector of Blake's works, requesting to see the manuscript of The French Revolution.

== Poem ==
The work is an anapestic iambic septenary poem, a poetic meter unique in Blake's poetry to this poem, that describes the events surrounding the French Revolution. Blake was an early supporter of the American Revolution and believed that it would bring about liberty to the rest of mankind. The French, according to Blake, were stuck in a problematic feudal system that was represented by the Bastille, a prison that kept enemies of the state. As the work continues, he demands that the Bastille be removed and he explains how the American Revolution provoked the French Revolution.

The dates spanned in the first book is from May 1789 until July 1789. Although Blake relies on history, he includes characters that are his own, but none of them are characters that he used in his mythological works. The work deals with the symbolism of the Bastille, which the seven towers of the Bastille representing a character type that was repressed by an oppressive government. As the work progresses, a dispute over governmental systems involves many characters including the representative of the feudal system, called Peer, Duke of Burgundy, and the Archbishop of Paris.

== Themes ==
Within the work, Blake emphasizes the problems of the feudal system and the corruption and decay of the French monarchy and church. The poem operates, according to G. E. Bentley, as a "psychomachia, a war of spirits, of the spirits of freedom and privilege. Some of the noblest rhetoric in the poem defends the ancient bastions of civilization". The language that Blake relies on in the poem is very political, but Blake felt that language in such discussions is replaced by rhetoric. In order to overcome that problem, he attempts to return to an original language.

Revolution is a recurring theme in Blake's works. In Blake's America, his views are expressed in the character of Orc. In The French Revolution, the ideas expressed are in direct contrast to those who stood against the French Revolution, including Edmund Burke. He accomplishes this by merging myth with history in order to create an apocalyptic vision that connects with the revolution. Other Romantic poets use apocalyptic imagery, but Blake's interpretation has a strong moral foundation. Like Blake's view of the American Revolution, in America, or the views expressed in Visions of the Daughters of Albion, the politics of the time are incorporated into a greater myth system.
