= William Blake's prophetic books =

Series of poetic works by William Blake

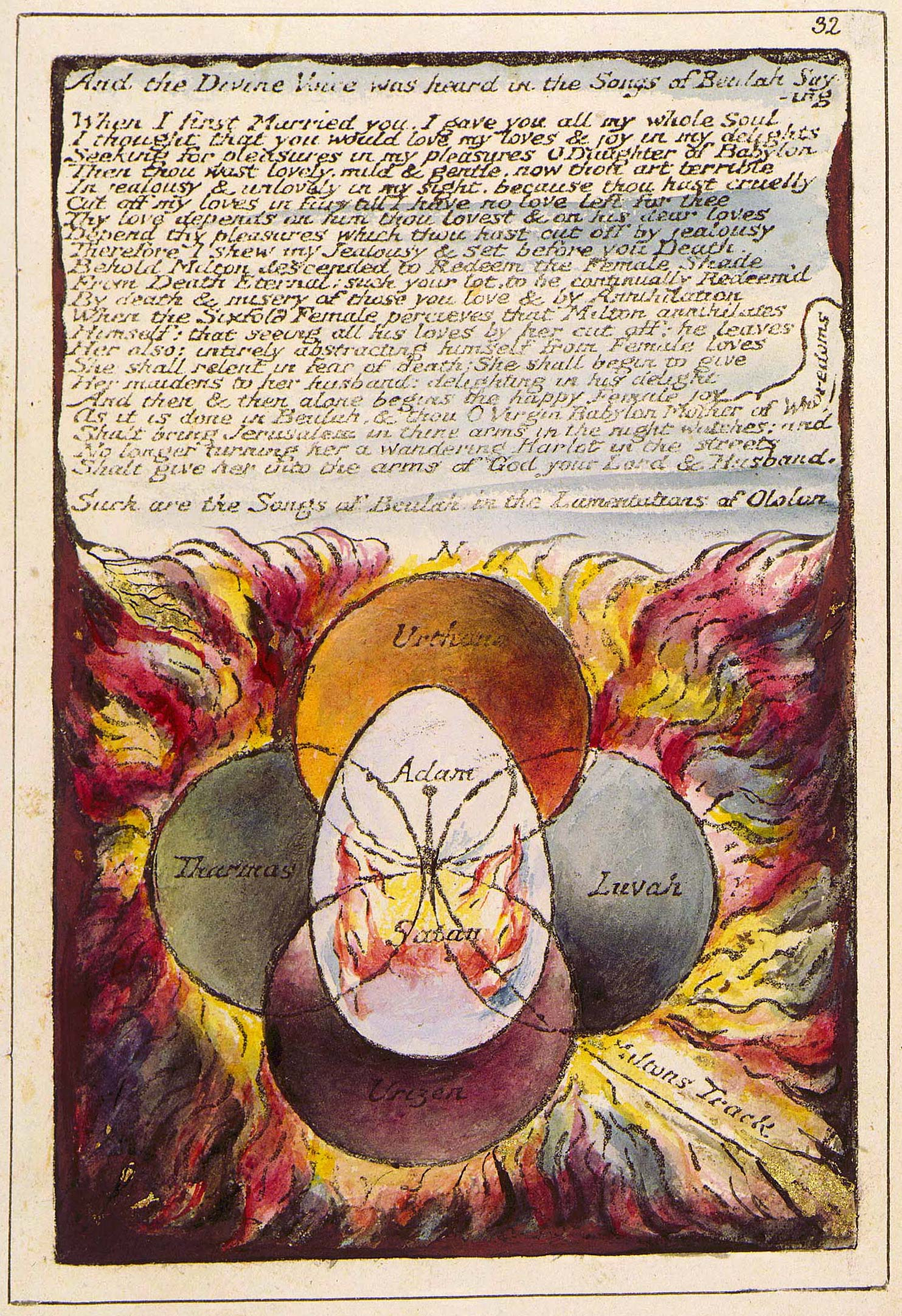
A page from Milton: A Poem in Two Books, one of Blake's prophetic books.

The prophetic books of the 18th-century English poet and artist William Blake are a series of lengthy, interrelated poetic works drawing upon Blake's own personal mythology. They have been described by 20th-century critic Northrop Frye as forming "what is in proportion to its merits the least read body of poetry in the English language". While Blake worked as a commercial illustrator, these books were ones that he produced, with his own engravings, as an extended and largely private project.

== Overview ==
In these works, concluding with the epic Jerusalem: The Emanation of the Giant Albion, he elaborated a personal invented mythology (mythopoeia). The mythopoeia is largely Biblical in inspiration; apart from that, it has been extensively debated for both its political and religious content.

While The French Revolution from 1791 is not illustrated and is usually excluded from the list of prophetic books, David V. Erdman contends that the separation of this work from the corpus removes a key to the symbolism used by Blake. Another work, Vala, or The Four Zoas (1797), begun while Blake was residing in Felpham, was abandoned in draft form; of this abandoning by Blake, Northrop Frye has commented that "[a]nyone who cares about poetry or painting must see in [Vala's] unfinished state a major cultural disaster".

=== Critical reception ===
The prophetic books have on occasion been dismissed as lacking in good sense. This position is now rarely held by scholars of English literature, Blake having been one of the major beneficiaries of critical fashion during the twentieth century. Northrop Frye and, following him, Harold Bloom have suggested that the difficulty of reading Blake's prophetic works can be overcome, and that the dismissive "mystical" tag applied to them is largely an obfuscation. "Mystical" as to the poetic language has indeed been the equivalent of "visionary" applied to the engravings.

Blake's prophetic books, having often been dismissed until recent times, have had a tortuous publication history, unlike his lyric poems, which have been regarded as more direct and relatively unproblematic.

== The continental prophecies ==
The cycle of continental prophecies comprises America a Prophecy (1793), Europe a Prophecy (1794) and The Song of Los (1795), which is made up of sections Africa and Asia.

America a Prophecy is divided into a Preludium (which is part of the Orc myth) and A Prophecy, which has obvious political content devolving from the American Revolution. The first line of A Prophecy is repeated as the final line of Africa. On the other hand, Europe a Prophecy has an unnamed introductory section, a Preludium with Orc and Enitharmon, and A Prophecy with connections to the contemporary situation of wartime Europe. The Asia section of The Song of Los links onto the end of Europe a Prophecy (via the word "howl").

== The books ==
1. Tiriel (c. 1789)
2. The Book of Thel (c. 1789)
3. The French Revolution (1791)
4. America a Prophecy (1793)
5. The Marriage of Heaven and Hell (1793)
6. Visions of the Daughters of Albion (1793)
7. Europe a Prophecy (1794)
8. The Book of Urizen (1794)
9. The Book of Ahania (1795)
10. The Book of Los (1795)
11. The Song of Los (1795)
12. Vala, or The Four Zoas (begun 1797, unfinished; abandoned 1807)
13. Milton: A Poem in Two Books (1804–1810)
14. Jerusalem: The Emanation of the Giant Albion (1804–1820)
