= French kiss (disambiguation) =

A French kiss is an amorous style of kiss using the tongue, which is not be confused with the unromantic cheek kiss, La bise, used for greeting.

French kiss or French kissing may also refer to:

== Film and television ==
- French Kiss (1995 film), a 1995 movie starring Meg Ryan and Kevin Kline
- French Kiss (2011 film), a French Canadian romantic comedy
- French Kiss (2015 film), a short film
- French Kisses, 1930 comedy short with Robert Agnew
- French Kiss, a Canadian Francophone music video program on MuchMusic

== Music ==
- French Kiss, disco/house project of producer Simon Soussan 1979
- French Kiss (band), a Japanese girl group formed in 2010
- Frenchkiss Records, a record label

=== Albums ===
- French Kiss (Bob Welch album), the debut album by Bob Welch
- French Kiss, Arielle Dombasle with The Hillbilly Moon Explosion 2015:
- French Kissin' – The Collection, an alternate title for the Deborah Harry Collection

=== Songs ===
- "French Kiss" (Lil Louis song), a 1989 house track by Lil Louis
- "French Kiss" (Kara song)
- "French Kissin'" (song), a 1986 song by Debbie Harry
- "French Kissing" (song), a 2001 song by Sarah Connor
- "French Kisses", a 2004 song by Jentina

== Other ==
- French KiSS, an extension of the Kisekae Set System
- French Kiss (yacht), a French 12-meter yacht and the associated syndicate that competed in the 1987 America's Cup
- French Kiss: Stephen Harper's Blind Date with Quebec, a 2007 book by Chantal Hébert
