= The Ancient of Days =

Painting and series of works by William Blake

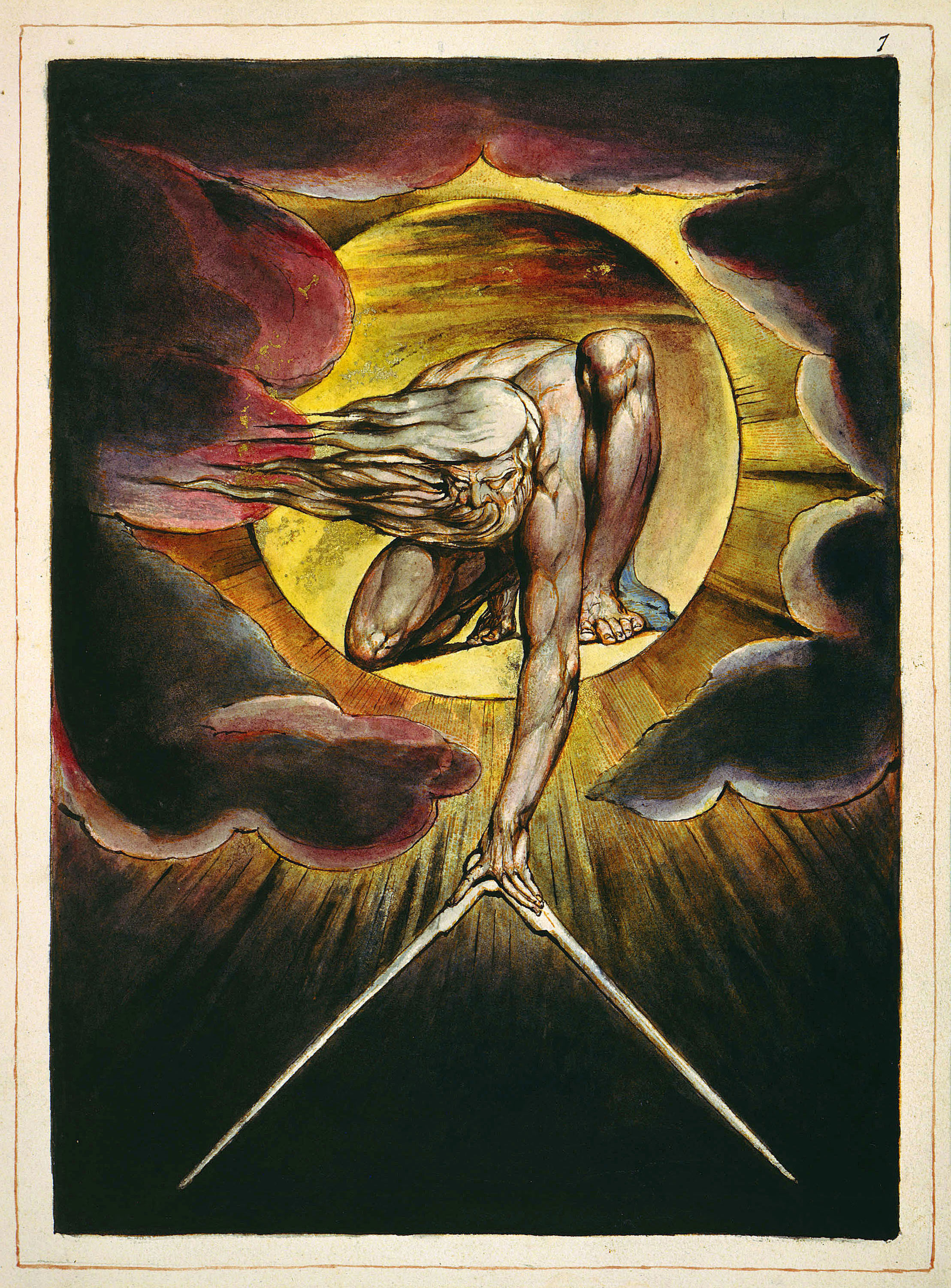
- The Ancient of Days setting a Compass to the Earth, frontispiece to copy K of Europe a Prophecy
- Artist: William Blake
- Year: 1794
- Medium: ink
- Movement: Romanticism
- Dimensions: 23.3 cm × 16.8 cm (9.2 in × 6.6 in)
- Location: Proof copy at the British Museum; London

The Ancient of Days is a design by William Blake, originally published as the frontispiece to the 1794 work Europe a Prophecy. It draws its name from one of God's titles in the Book of Daniel and shows Urizen crouching in a circular design with a cloud-like background. His outstretched hand holds a compass over the darker void below. The same concept of a crouching figure holding a compass was used by Blake in his Newton, completed the next year. As noted in Alexander Gilchrist's 1863 book, Life of William Blake, the design of The Ancient of Days was "a singular favourite with Blake and as one it was always a happiness to him to copy". As such there are many versions of the work extant, including one completed for Frederick Tatham only weeks before Blake's death.

The British Museum notes that one copy, accessioned in 1885, was excluded from Martin Butlin's 1982 catalogue raisonné of Blake's paintings and drawings, suggesting the author doubted that attribution.

Early critics of Blake noted the work as amongst his best, and a favourite of the artist himself. A description by Richard Thompson in John Thomas Smith's Nollekens and His Times, was of "... an uncommonly fine specimen of art, and approaches almost to the sublimity of Raffaelle or Michel Angelo", and as representing the event given in the Book of Proverbs viii. 27 (KJV), "when he set a compass upon the face of the earth". The subject is said to have been one of the 'visions' experienced by Blake and that he took a special pleasure in producing the prints. The copy commissioned by Tatham in the last days of Blake's life, for a sum of money exceeding any previous payment for his work, was tinted by the artist while propped up in his bed. After his revisions, it is said that Blake

threw it from him, and with an air of exulting triumph exclaimed, "There, that will do! I cannot mend it."

The image was used as the cover of the 1992 book Fearful Symmetry: Is God a Geometer by Ian Stewart and Marty Golubitsky, and the 2006 paperback cover of Stephen Hawking's 2005 book God Created the Integers. It was also used as a design influence for the album cover of The Concept (1978) by American funk band Slave.

== Gallery of extant copies ==
There are currently thirteen known extant copies of Europe a Prophecy. Because of Blake's production process of hand colouring each print, each image has its own unique qualities. The following images of The Ancient of Days are those available via the digital archiving project, the William Blake Archive:

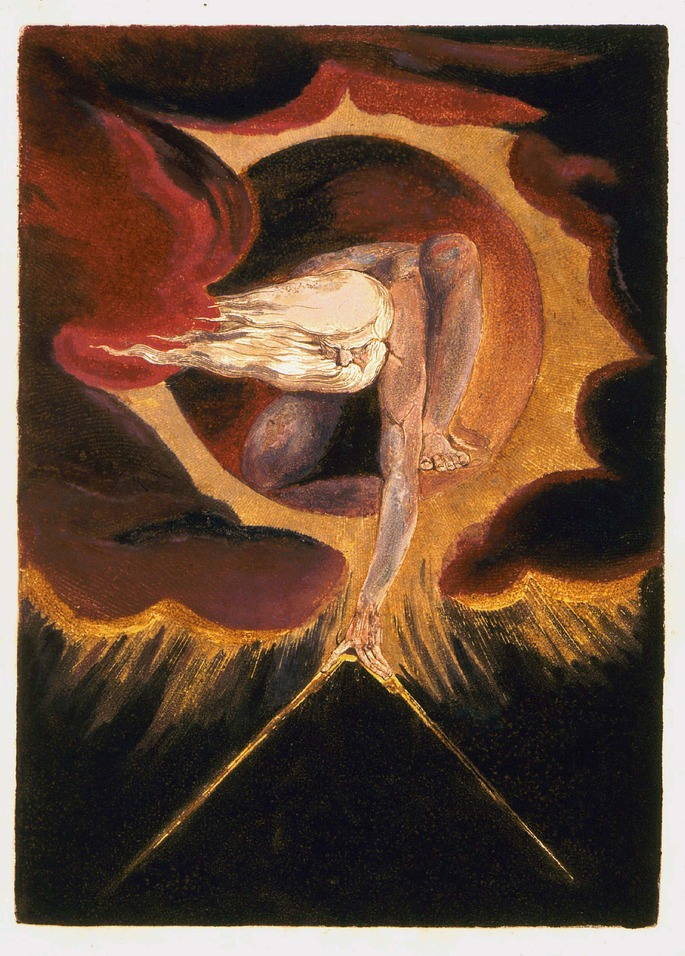
The Ancient of Days in Europe a Prophecy, copy B, from the Glasgow University Library

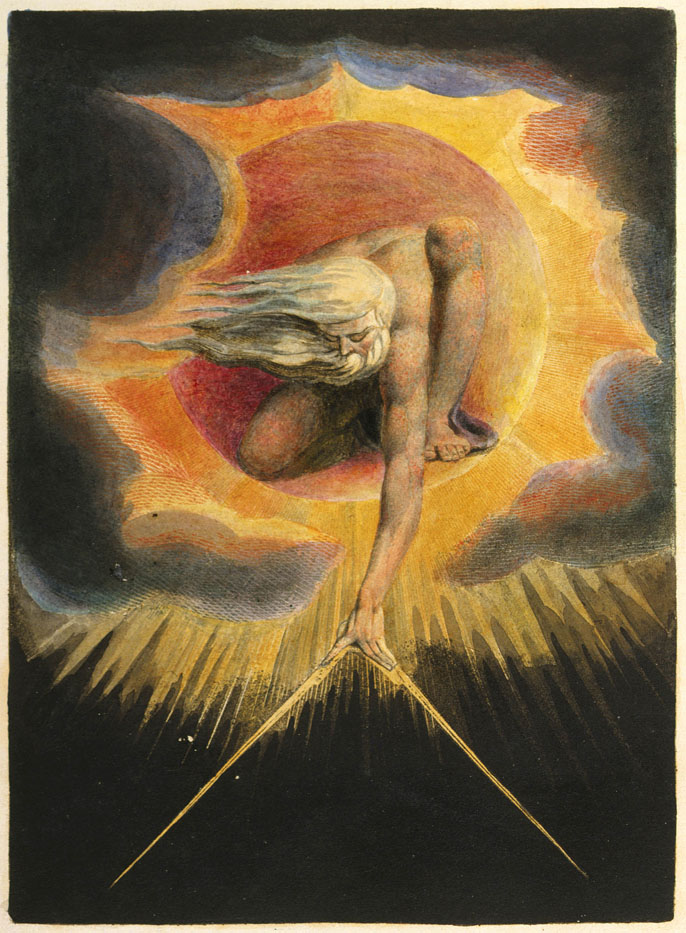
The Ancient of Days in Europe a Prophecy, copy D, from the British Museum

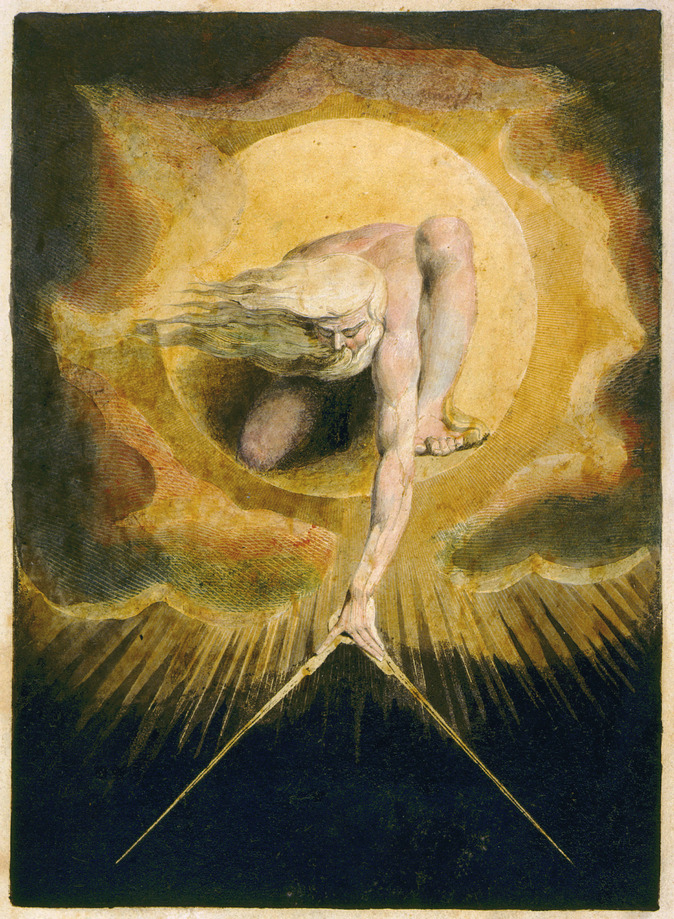
The Ancient of Days in Europe a Prophecy, copy E, from the Library of Congress

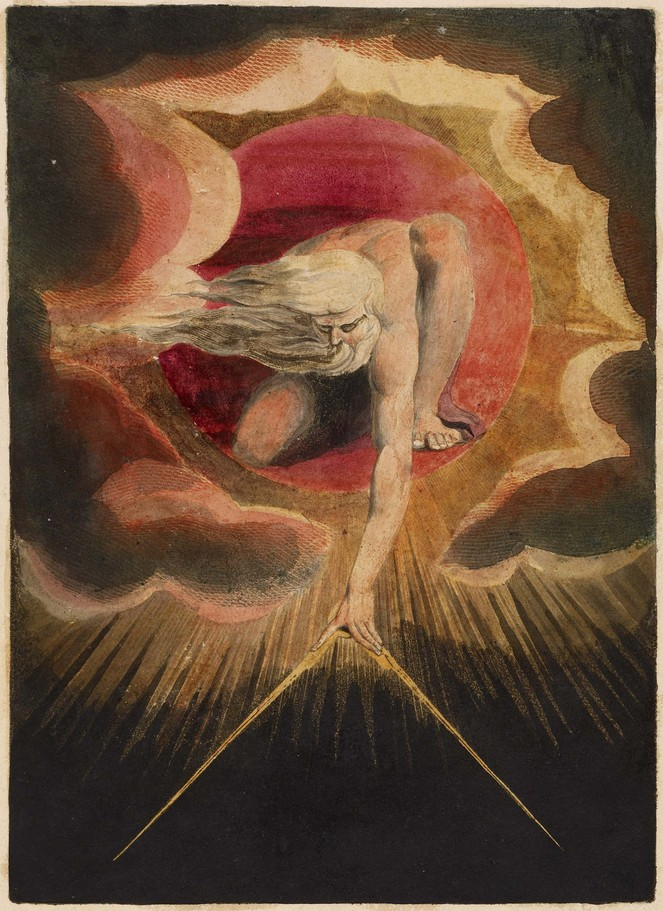
The G copy, Morgan Library & Museum

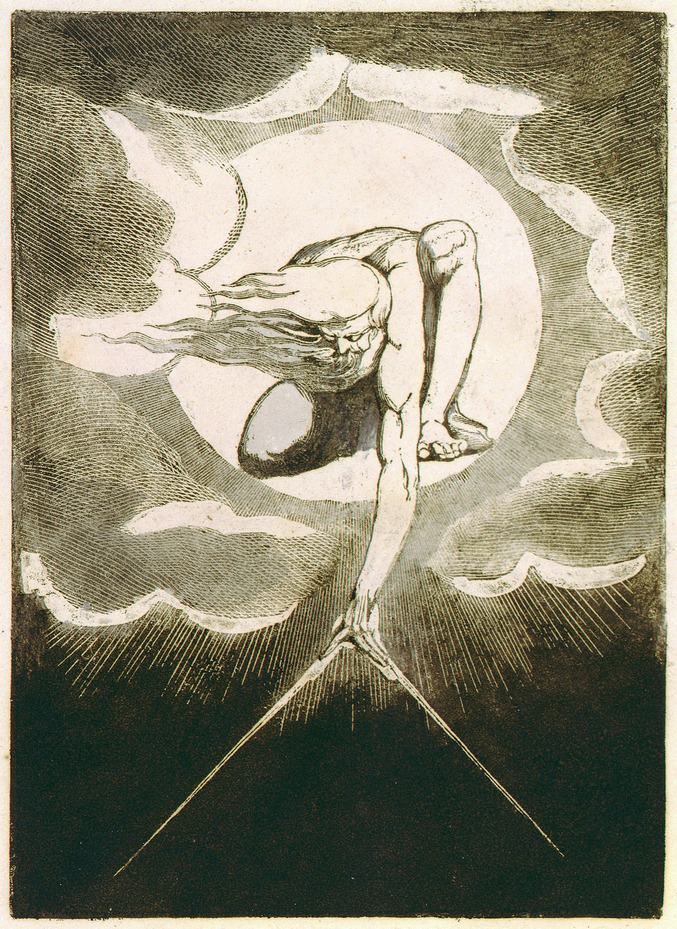
The Ancient of Days in Europe a Prophecy, copy H, from the Houghton Library

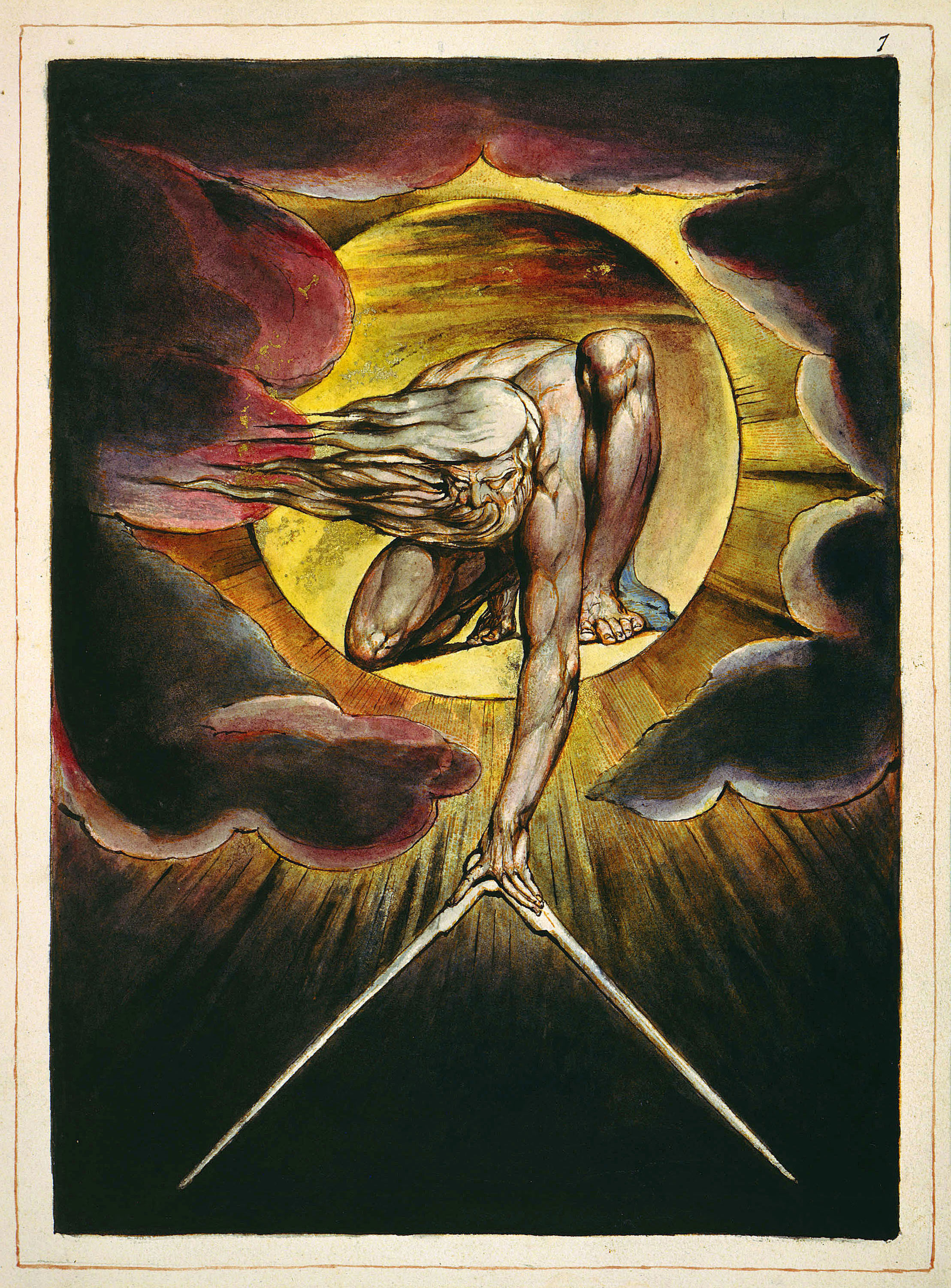
The Ancient of Days in Europe a Prophecy, copy K, from the Fitzwilliam Museum

== Museums/Libraries with extant copies ==
=== Copy a (1794) ===
- British Museum, London

=== Copy B (1794) ===
- Glasgow University Library

=== Copy C (1794) ===
- Houghton Library, Harvard University, Cambridge, USA

=== Copy D (1794) ===
- British Museum, London

=== Copy E (1794) ===
- Library of Congress, Washington

=== Copy F (1794) ===
- New York Public Library

=== Copy G (1794) ===
- Morgan Library and Museum, New York

=== Copy A (1795) ===
- Yale Centre for British Art, New Haven

=== Copy H (1795) ===
- Houghton Library, Harvard University

=== Copy I (1829) ===
- Auckland Public Library

=== Copy K (1821) ===
- Fitzwilliam Museum, Cambridge

=== Copy L (1829) ===
- Huntington Library, San Marino

=== Copy M (1832) ===
- Fitzwilliam Museum, Cambridge

=== Copy MPI (1832) ===
- Various museums
