= Frenching =

Frenching may refer to:

- Frenching (automobile), recessing or moulding a car body to give a smoother look to the vehicle
- French kissing, using the tongue in the act of kissing
- Exposing the bone on a rack of lamb

== See also ==
- Frenching the Bully, an album by The Gits
- French kiss (disambiguation)
