= Justice French =

Justice French may refer to:

- C. G. W. French (1822–1891), chief justice of the Arizona Territorial Supreme Court
- Christopher French (judge) (1925–2003), judge of the English High Court of Justice
- George W. French (1823–1887), associate justice of the South Dakota Supreme Court
- John French (judge) (1670–1728), associate justice of the Delaware Supreme Court
- Judith L. French (born 1962), associate justice of the Ohio Supreme Court
- Robert French (born 1947), chief justice of the High Court of Australia
- Walter M. French (1874–1930), associate justice of the Washington Supreme Court

== See also ==
- For the system of Justice in France, see Judiciary of France.
