= French Kiss (yacht) =

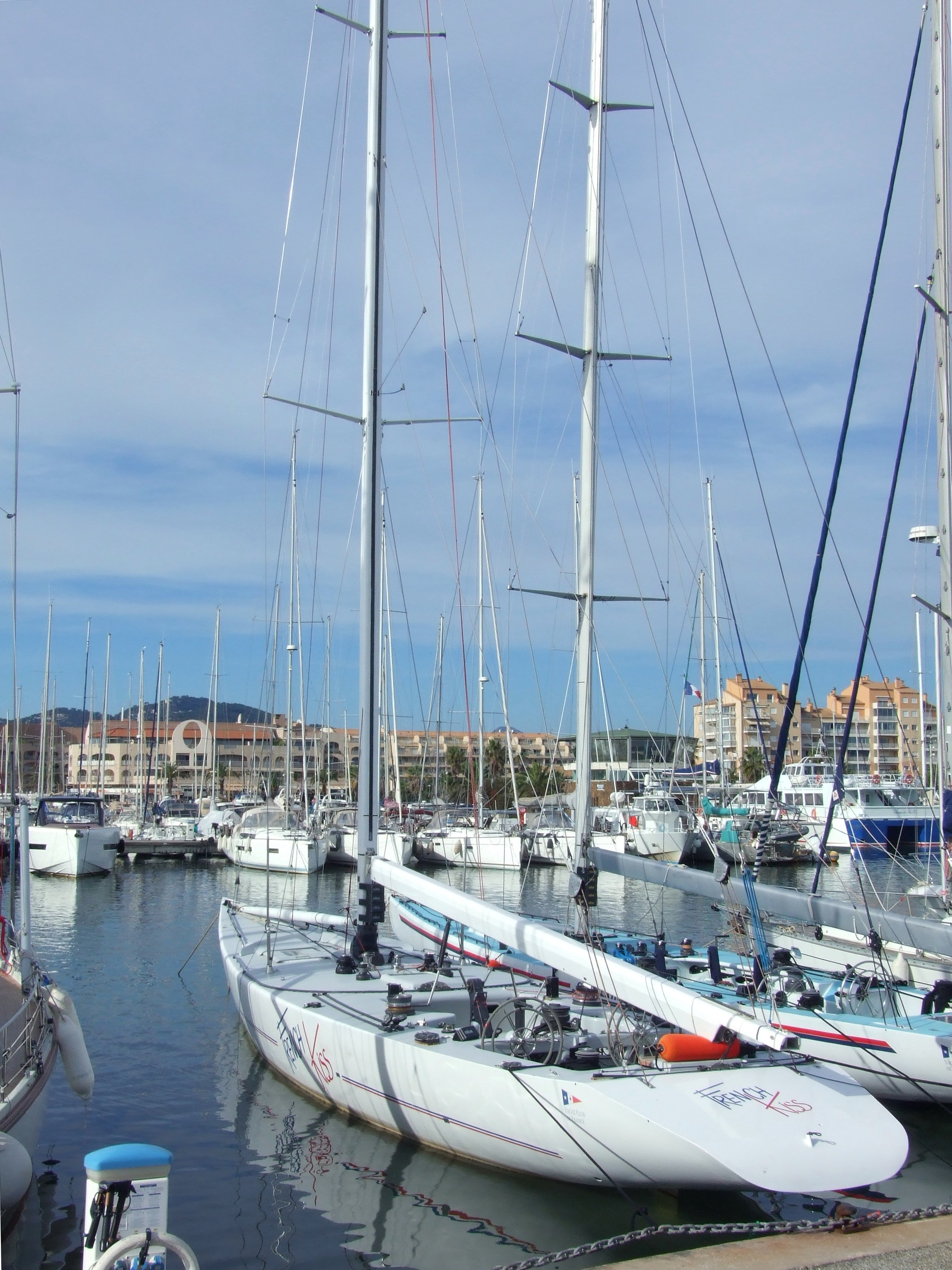
- French kiss F-7, en 2024.
- Yacht club: Société des Régates Rochelaises
- Nation: France
- Class: 12-metre
- Sail no: F–7

Racing career
- AC Challenger Selection Series: 1987

French Kiss is a 12-metre class yacht that competed in the 1987 Louis Vuitton Cup.
