= The French Revolution (novel) =

2009 novel by Matt Stewart

The French Revolution is a novel written by American writer Matt Stewart. It was first published online on Bastille Day, July 14, 2009. It is Stewart's debut novel and the first novel to be published on Twitter. A print version was later released on the same date the following year.

== Plot ==
The novel follows the lives of the Van Twinkles for thirty years and is loosely structured after the French Revolution. After a brief romance in San Francisco, Esmerelda Van Twinkle gives birth to fraternal twins Robespierre and Marat on Bastille Day. She raises the children with her autocratic mother. The twins would go on to rebel against their family and pursue a life in politics and beyond.

== Characters ==
- Esmeralda Van Twinkle — a former pastry chef turned cashier in a copy shop
- Jasper Winslow —restaurant coupon salesman, father of Marat and Robespierre
- Marat and Robespierre — fraternal twins born on Bastille Day
- Fanny Van Twinkle — Esmeralda's alcoholic, depressive mother

== Publication history ==
Author Matt Stewart wrote the novel primarily in San Francisco over the course of five years. His agent pitched the story to the major publishing houses, but they viewed it as a risky purchase and turned it down due to its raunchy language and fantastical plot. Unable to secure a publisher, Stewart decided to publish the story online. On Bastille Day, July 14, 2009, Stewart began posting "The French Revolution" onto Twitter via an internet bot his friend built that broke down the novel into 3,700 140-character posts. Stewart called the project a "social experiment". He also distributed copies of the novel on Scribd and Kindle Store.

Soft Skull Press subsequently published the project in print on Bastille Day 2010.

== Reception ==
Kirkus Reviews called it "easy entertainment in book form." Andrew Leland for the San Francisco Chronicle likened the novel to A Confederacy of Dunces, saying "Both are deeply satirical and affectionate portraits of a city in all its messy, multiethnic splendor, seen through queasy glimpses over the fleshy shoulders of its obese, big-mouthed protagonist." The Chronicle later listed it in their "Best of 2010 - Books by Bay Area authors" list.

Anne Whitaker for The Boston Globe noted the allegorical similarities between the novel's characters and the real life figures during the actual French Revolution, saying "All of which points to a central problem in the book. That is, the way this juxtaposition is handled prevents either story, the historical revolution or the family drama, from providing any insight into the other." Ellen Wernecke for The A.V. Club wrote, "Stewart adds plenty of memorable curlicues to his characters; the problem is, he doesn’t know when to stop adding and refine or pare back his creations."
