= Vicent Franch =

Vicent Franch i Ferrer (Burriana, Castellón; 1949) is a Spanish jurist, politologist, journalist and writer.

== Career ==
Franch is a professor of Constitutional Law and Political and Administration Science at the University of Valencia. He was the appointed judge for the Administration Courtroom of the Superior Court of the Valencian Community from 1990 to 1995. He has been Director of the Electoral Documentation Centre of the Valencian Community. Some years ago he was appointed Director of the series of books 'Estudi General-Textos Valencians' of the Alfons el Magnànim Institution of the Council of Valencia. The aim of this collection is to recover the most important Valencian contributions to social debate and thought, from the time of Arnau de Vilanova to the present. Several times he has been Director of the Department of Constitutional Law and Political and Administration Science of the University of Valencia. At present he is director of the magazine Tractat de l'Aigua (Valencian Interdisciplinary Review on Water). During the Spanish Transition he was first President and later Síndic Major of the Agrupació Borrianenca de Cultura (Cultural Association of Burriana). He was mayor of the village of Aín, in the province of Castelló, from 1999 to 2003.

During these years Franch has also taken part in several debates, and in colloquia and conferences. He has also taken part in many courses and seminars.

== Publications ==
=== Questions of law ===
Vicent Franch is the author of roughly a dozen books and of nearly one hundred articles, which deal with Valencian political history, local Spanish law, linguistic rights and political theory and practice. He has written several studies and reports about the present problems of the Valencian regional government, and he is the author of a lengthy report about the change in the electoral system of the Spanish Senate, which was requested by the Senate itself in 1997.

Together with other university professors, he wrote the Morella Statute (1979). During the Spanish Transition, this document proposed different versions of the Statute of Autonomy for the Valencian region. Franch has supervised and published several studies about polls and the political behaviour of Valencians. He is the author of a set of proposals for the reform of the Valencian Statute of Autonomy (2005), and also about linguistic rights.

The following publications can be pointed out:

- Volem l'Estatut! Una Autonomia possible per al País Valencià (in collaboration with others) (1977). (in Catalan) ISBN 84-7199-071-7
- El nacionalisme agrarista valencià (1918–1923) (1981). (in Catalan) ISBN 84-7199-138-1
- El blasquisme: Reorganització i conflictes polítics (1928–1936) (1984), which received the Vicent Boix Essay Prize. (in Catalan) ISBN 84-500-9756-8
- Document 88 (in collaboration with others) (1989). (in Catalan)
- Vicent Cañada Blanch (1900–1993): la voluntad de mecenazgo (2010) (lengthy biography about this patrician from Borriana). (in Spanish) ISBN 978-84-7822-584-2
- El sentiment constitucional dels valencians (2003). (in Catalan)
- Les eleccions autonòmiques i municipals del 25 de maig del 2003 a la Comunitat Valenciana (2005) (Franch is the author and publisher). (in Catalan)

=== Creative work ===
Fiction writing is one of Franch's most beloved hobbies, and he has published several books of fiction. Among the most notable:

- La vetla d'En Pere Ruixes (Malvarrosa Tales Prize in 1978). (in Catalan)
- La fuita d'En Quim Ortolà (1984). (in Catalan)
- L'Enquesta (and other tales) (Pasqual Tirado Tales Prize in 1984).(in Catalan)
- Estius a la Carta (1990). (in Catalan)
- Palamarinar (1994) (book that deals with magic and his own autobiography). (in Catalan)

Franch was director of the series El Conte del Diumenge (Prometeo Publishing House) during its last period (1900–1980). From time to time he has written literary reviews.

=== Journalism ===
Franch has been a press columnist since 1976 and has written articles for many newspapers and magazines, both in Spanish and in Valencian:

- Castellón Diario, Mediterráneo and Levante de Castelló.
- Las Provincias, Diario de Valencia, Notícias al Día, Levante-EMV, Hoja del Lunes and El Temps, all in Valencian.
- Outside the Valencian area he has published articles in ABC, Diario de Mallorca, Avui, Deia, La Vanguardia, and from 1995 to 2008 he was a regular columnist in El País.

Franch may have written and published more than 2500 press columns and articles over the years. At present he is preparing the publication of several books containing his entire journalistic output.
