= America a Prophecy =

1793 book by William Blake

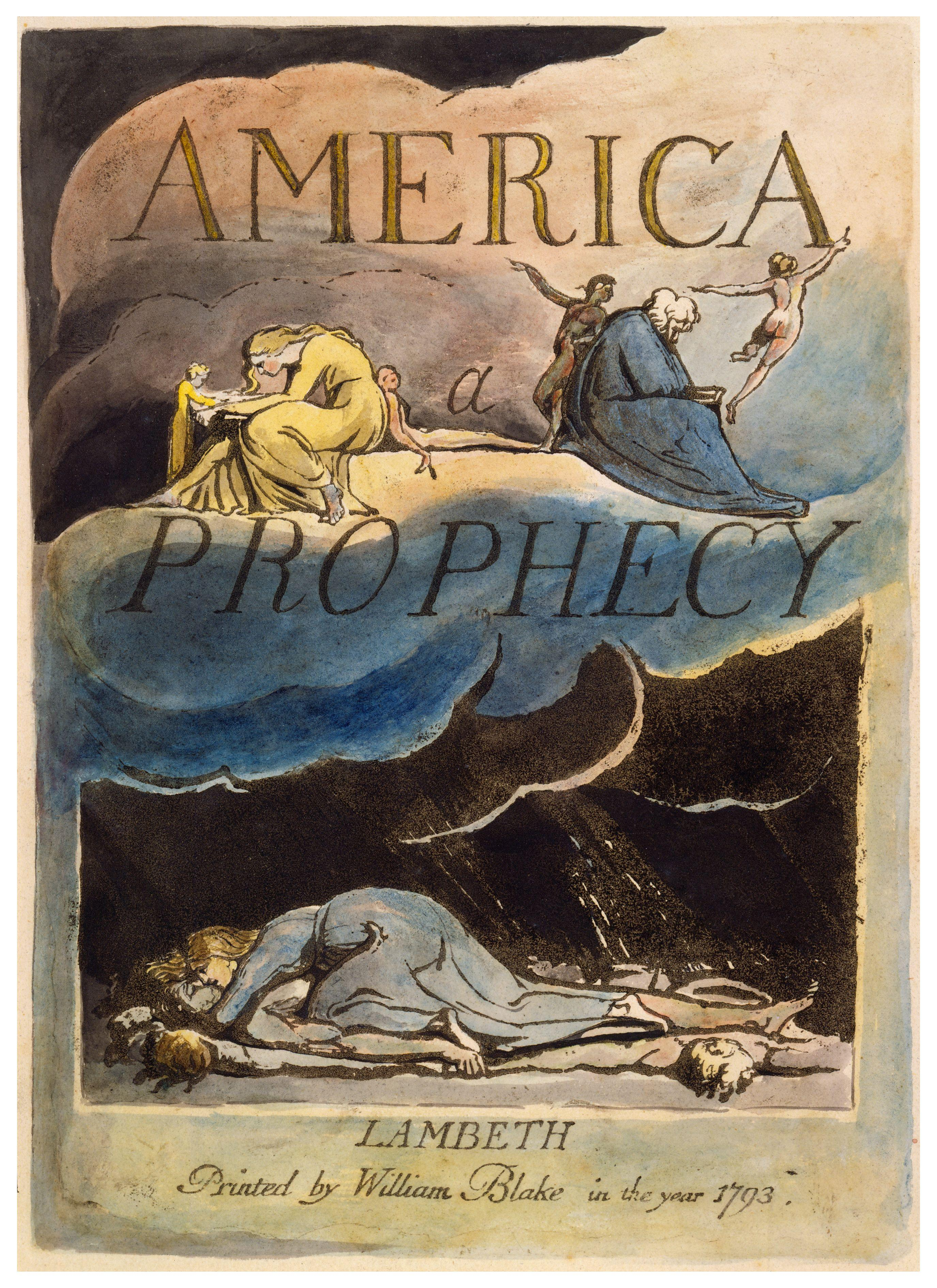
Title page of America a Prophecy, copy A (printed 1793), collection the Morgan Library

America a Prophecy is a 1793 prophetic book by the English poet and illustrator William Blake. It is engraved on eighteen plates, and survives in fourteen known copies. It is the first of Blake's Continental prophecies.

== Background ==
During autumn 1790, Blake moved to Lambeth, Surrey (today within the bounds of Greater London). He had a studio at the new house that he used while writing what were later called his "Lambeth Books", which included America in 1793. Like the others under the title, all aspects of the work, including the composition of the designs, the printing of them, the colouring of them, and the selling of them, happened at his home. America was the first book printed by Blake to include the place of origin and Blake's full name on the title page, which showed that Blake would continue to expound his visions of revolution even though parliament had passed acts against seditious writings earlier that year. Blake wrote in his notebook "I say I shan't live five years. And if I live one it will be a Wonder. June 1793". Early sketches for America were also included in this notebook, which Blake used between 1790 and 1793. While early drafts of America mentioned King George III by name, Blake scrupulously avoided this in the final draft, referring to him as "the King of England", or other synonyms.

Only a few of Blake's works were fully coloured, and America was one of the few works that Blake describes as "illuminated printing", those of which were either hand coloured or colour printed with the ink being placed on the copperplate before printed. There were 17 copies of America created with 4 of them coloured. The work contained 18 plates, and were 23 x 17 cm in size. The lines of poetry included in the work were organized into septenaries. Henry Crabb Robinson contacted William Upcott on 19 April 1810 inquiring about copies of Blake's works that were in his possession. On that day, Robinson was allowed access to Europe and America and created a transcription of the works.

== Poem ==
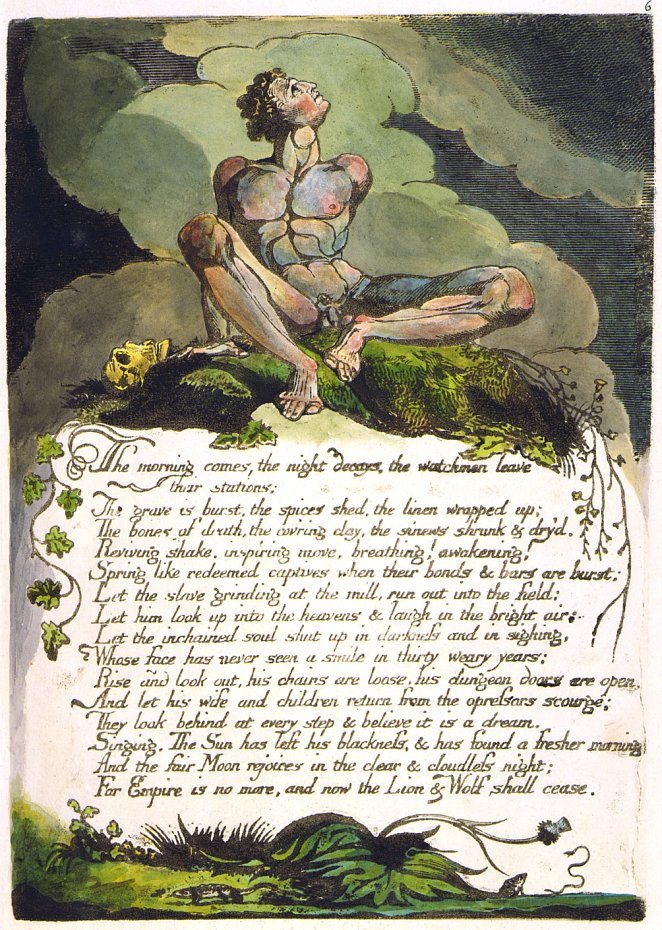
In plate 8 (copy A) Orc, spirit of revolution, arises. "The grave is burst, the spices shed, the linen wrapped up"

The image A Breach in a City served as the frontispiece for America and was originally shown on its own at the Royal Academy during April 1784. The work was probably based on the Gordon riots at Newgate Prison during June 1780.

The implications of the work are taken up again in America with the King of England trembling as he sees Orc, the embodiment of the American colonies. The Angel of Albion believes Orc is the Anti-Christ and Orc believes the King of England is the same. This is followed by Orc's apocalyptic vision:

The morning comes, the night decays, the watchmen leave their stations;
The grave is burst, the spices shed, the linen wrapped up

— Lines 37-38

Orc provokes the Angel of Boston to rebellion:

"What God is he, writes laws of peace, & clothes him in a tempest
What pitying Angel lusts for tears, and fans himself with sighs
What crawling villain preaches abstinence & wraps himself
In fat of lambs? no more I follow, no more obedience pay."

— Lines 126-129

Together, the rebels are able to be freed of the psychological chains that bind them:

the five gates of their law-built heaven

— Line 222

== Themes ==
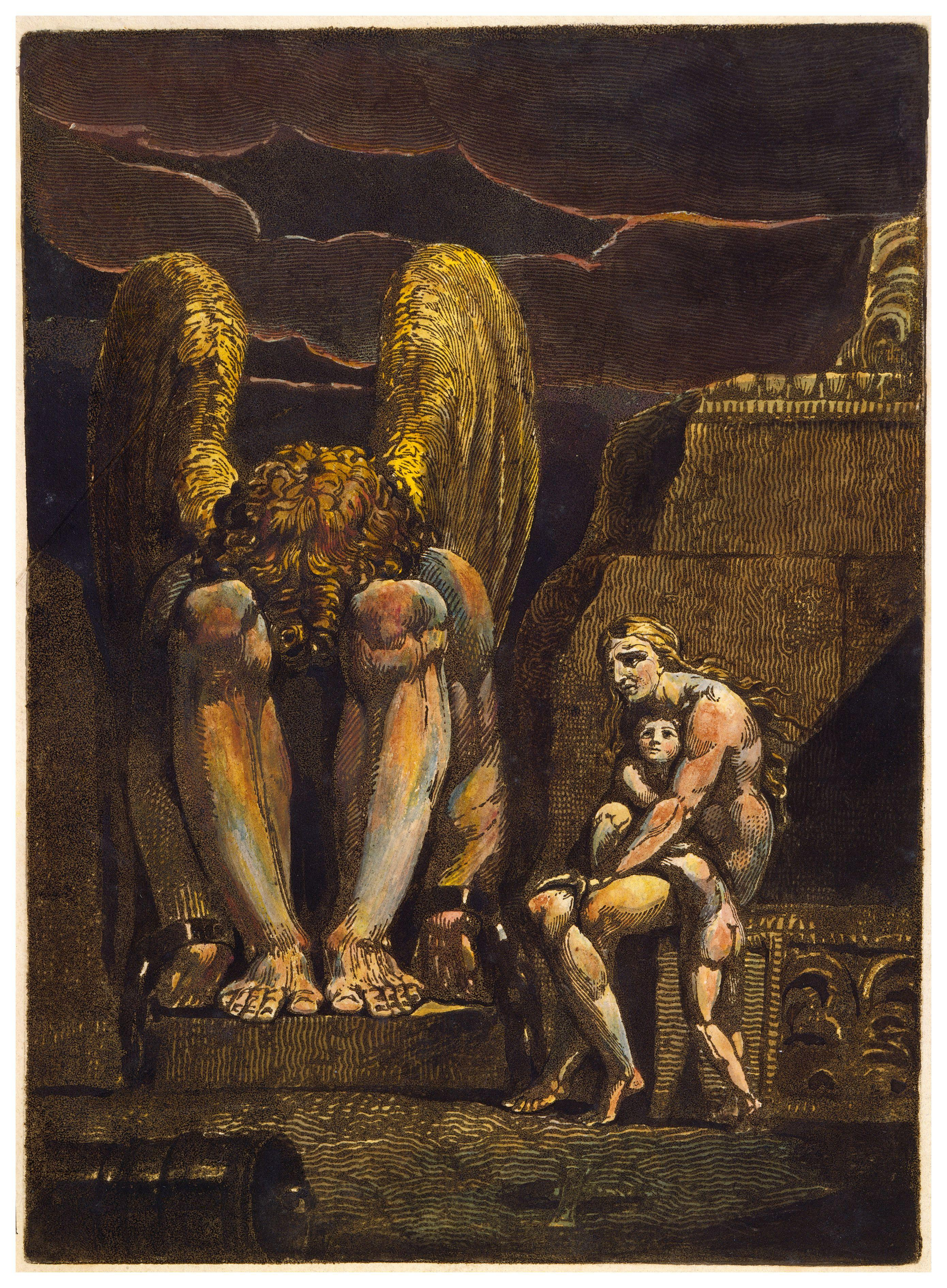
The frontispiece to America a Prophecy (Copy A)

America, like many of Blake's other works, is a mythological narrative and is considered a "prophecy". However, only America and Europe were ever given that title by Blake. His understanding of the word was not to denote a description of the future but to describe the view of the honest and the wise. America was also the first book that Blake titled a Prophecy. This change indicates that he was no longer dramatizing history, as in The French Revolution, but instead "recording the formula of all revolution". For that reason the events of the revolution are portrayed without regard for chronological order: the governors meet at the house of Sir Francis Bernard (who had been recalled in 1769), the 37-year-old King George is described as having "aged limbs", and other episodes are compressed or out of order.

In regards to the prophetic works, the character Oothoon represented America in Visions of the Daughters of Albion and she is raped by the character Bromion. The book represents her as trapped by a philosophical system created by John Locke, and no one is able to hear her pleas except for the daughters of Albion. The implications of the work are taken up again in America with the King of England trembling as he witnesses Orc and the rebelling colonies. Although there is a vision of rebellion, there is no actual freedom at the end of the poem just as in the Visions of the Daughters of Albion. Unlike the Visions of the Daughters of Albion, America, as well as Europe, describes nations that are trying to determine their own destiny instead of individuals trying to deal with theirs. The Song of Los is connected to both America and Europe in that it describes Africa and Asia, which operate as a sort of frame to the other works. As such, the three works are united by the same historical and social themes.

When Blake describes pity becoming a trade along with generosity becoming a science, it is possible that he is referring to how a Parish School of Industry at Golden Square transformed from a school that educated students in manual labour to a factory system in which the students were producing goods for sale after 1786. Other political aspects of the work include Blake's portrayal of Thomas Paine as a defender of liberty in regards to Paine's Rights of Man. Furthermore, the image of the English prince being a dragon figure is connected to a literary tradition of heroes slaying a dragon that has tyrannised a country. Likewise, in Biblical and apocalyptic tradition, the dragon is defeated by the Messiah. As such, the image in America a Prophecy is that the rebellion is a natural struggle for freedom against oppression and a renewal of society. It is part of a natural cycle.

In other regards, the work deals with the oppression of the mind, with the dragon being representative of this repression. The "Ancient of Days", represented in America a Prophecy by Urizen, who is like Zeus, Jehovah and other leaders of gods, is the creator of religion. He is old in a mentally frail manner as well as cruel. Urizen is represented as white, which is connected to snow, colourlessness, atheism and the unknown. He is always an abstraction, Orc, on the other hand, is the representation of revolution, along with blood, rage and passion. The polarity of the characters and their contest is connected to the Ossian poem Carric-Thura, which describes the old and cruel god Loda being attacked by the hero Fingal, who drives the god away. However, both characters are interconnected, with Orc being the force of new life in the cycle and Urizen representing the older version of Orc that dies at the end of the cycle.

Blake had many expectations for the American Revolution, which is described in a prophetic way within the poem. However, he was disappointed when the fallen state of existence returned and that slavery was not immediately ended. He was also disappointed when there was not a sensual liberation. After Napoleon Bonaparte declared himself Emperor in 1804, Blake believed that the Americans would start treating George Washington as their god-king in the manner that the French treated Bonaparte and the British monarch George III. He continued to believe in an apocalyptic state that would soon appear, but he no longer believed that Orc man, the leader of a revolution, would be the agent of the apocalypse. Instead, he believed that God could only exist in men, and he distrusted all hero worship.

== Critical response ==
Allan Cunningham believed that the work was "plentifully seasoned with verse". Henry Crabb Robinson believed the work to be obscure. J. T. Smith was confused by the "expressions", which "are mystical in a very high degree", but thought the poem's designs were "very fine". Alexander Gilchrist remarked that "Turning over the leaves it is sometimes like an increase of light on the retina, so fair and open is the effect of particular pages".
