= Continental prophecies =

Group of illuminated books by William Blake

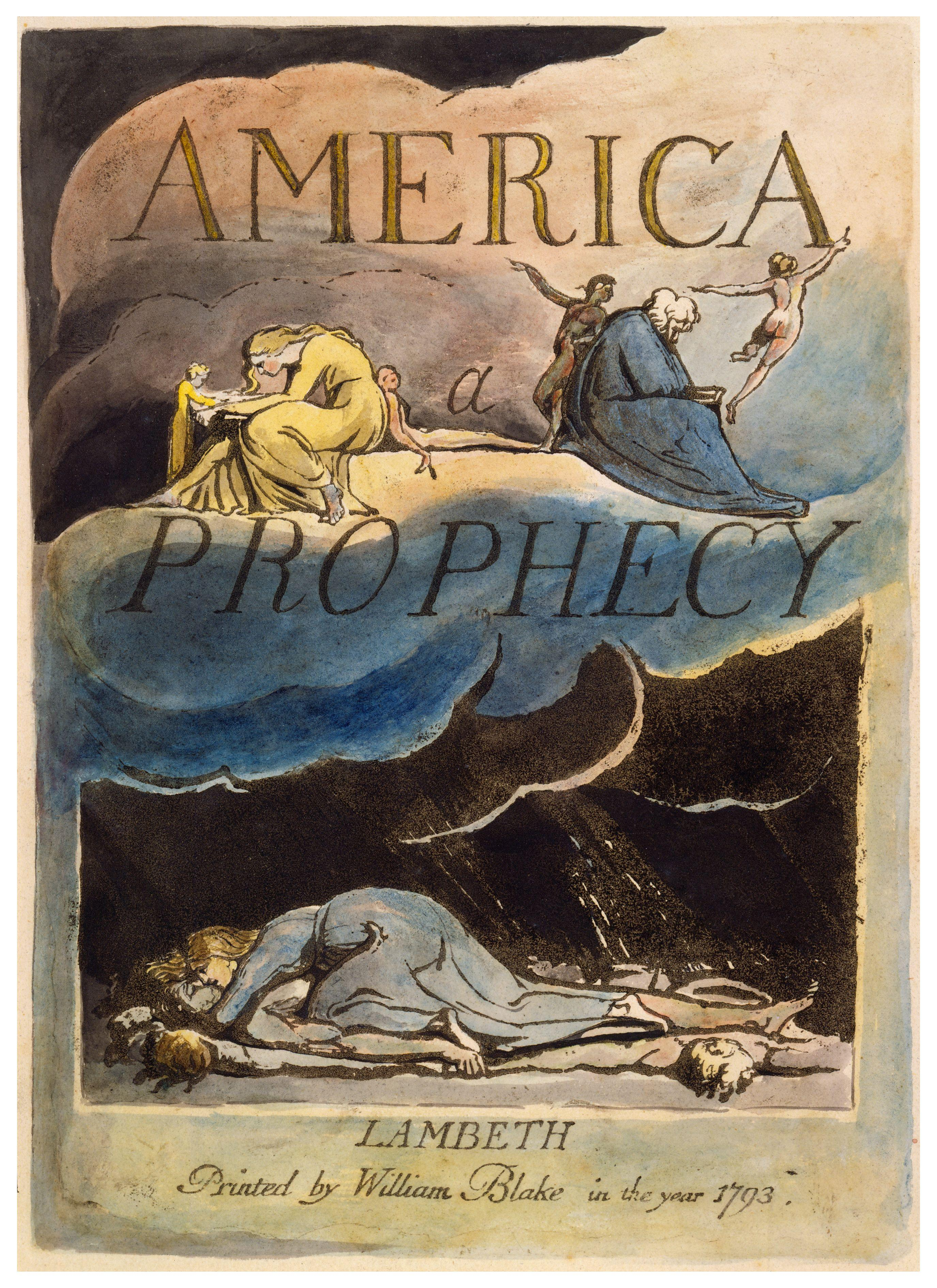
Title page of America a Prophecy, 1793

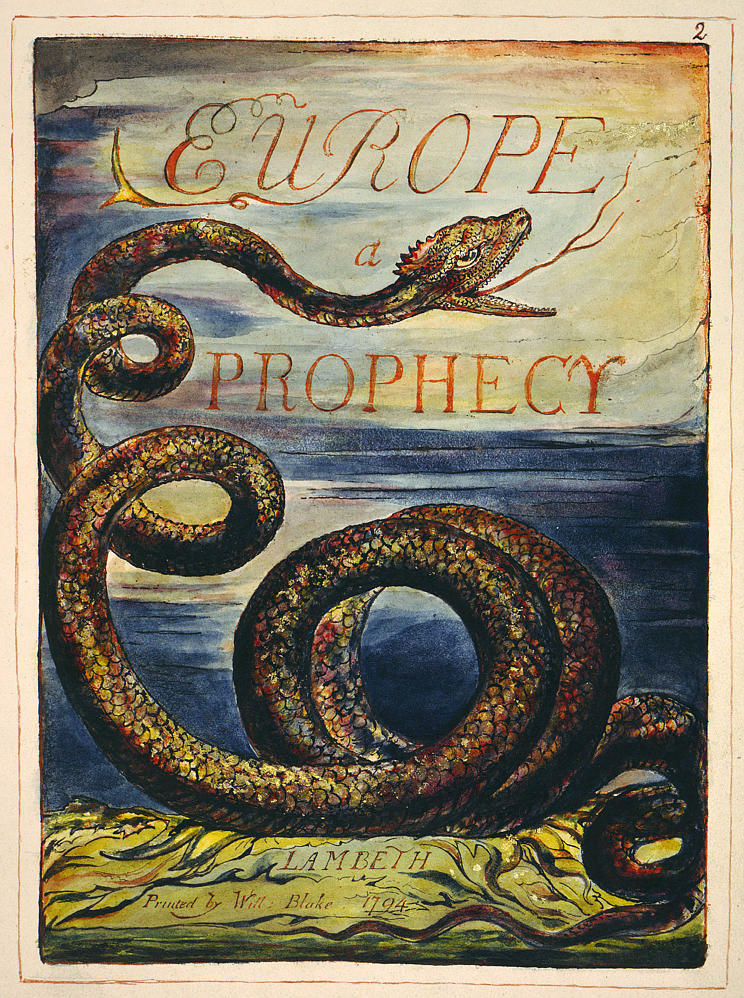
Title page of Europe a Prophecy, 1794

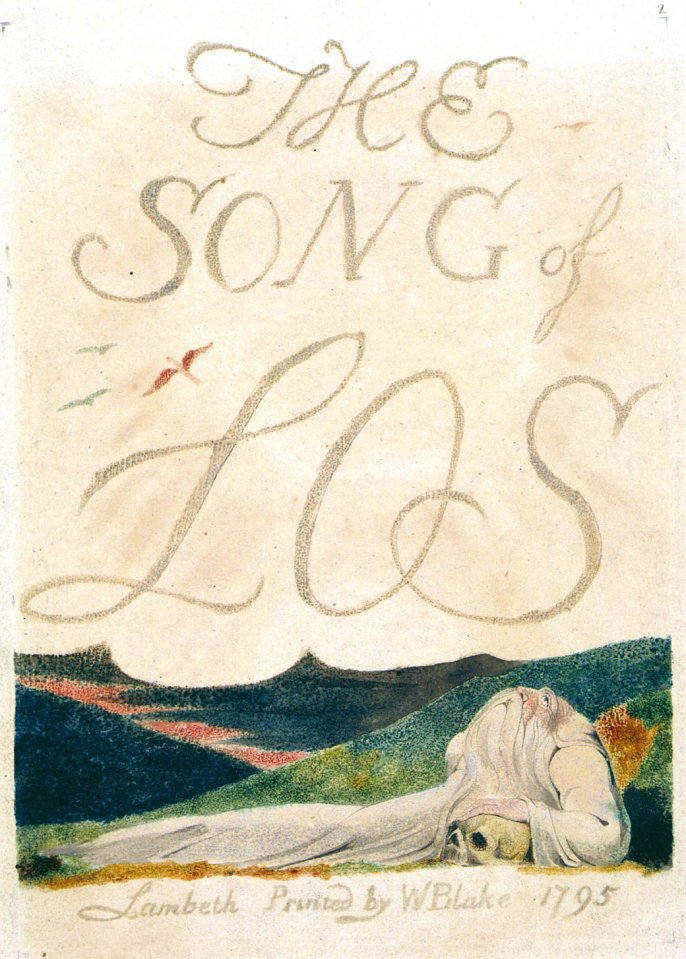
Title page of The Song of Los, 1795

The continental prophecies is a group of illuminated books by William Blake that have been subject of numerous studies due to their recurrent and unorthodox use of political, literary and sexual metaphors. They consist of America, Europe and The Song of Los (Africa and Asia).

== Background ==
Blake's works describing the four continents prophecies are part of his "Lambeth Books", based on their creation at his home in Lambeth, Surrey. Of these works there are America a Prophecy created in 1793, Europe a Prophecy created in 1794, and The Song of Los created in 1795. Like other "Lambeth Books", all aspects of the works, including the composition of the designs, their printing, coloring, and sale, happened at his home. The pages of the works and images were 23 x 17 cm in size. All three of the works were occasionally bound together as a set.

== Plot ==
The plots of America a Prophecy, Europe a Prophecy and The Song of Los, divided into "Africa" and "Asia", are all part of the same group of poems. They, like The Marriage of Heaven and Hell, describe the story of Orc as the works all portray these events with a focus on satire, society, liberty found in revolution, and the apocalypse.

=== America ===
The first book, America a Prophecy, describes Orc's encouragement of the rebellion in the Americas. The work begins with the King of England trembling as he sees Orc. Orc provokes the people to rise up, and he witnesses an apocalyptic revelation of a new world.

=== Europe ===
The second book, Europe a Prophecy, describes the rebellion in France. The work describes the entrapment of men and women into constrictive gender relationships, and the serpent was originally the infinite bound up by the finite under God's tyranny. At the end of the story, Los calls forth a rebellion.

=== Africa ===
"Africa" is the first half of The Song of Los, created last. The story begins in Africa with Los singing of Adam, Noah, and Moses were witnesses to Urizen granting laws to humanity. These laws involve abstractions being granted to Pythagoras, Socrates, and Plato, gospel being given to Jesus, a bible for Mahomet, and a book on war given to Odin. The last of the laws were those of the five senses, which were given to John Locke and to Isaac Newton. All of these laws were chains that bound the mind and caused the world.

=== Asia ===
"Asia" is the second half of The Song of Los. In the work, Orc creates fires in the mind that provokes a thought revolution. This causes the kings of the world to be startled as an apocalypse of sorts is begun.

== Themes ==
Blake scholars have suggested that the Continental prophecies follow a common thread in depicting the struggle for freedom experienced during Blake's time, in the American War and in the outbreak of revolutionary activity in London. The recurring appearance of Orc, symbol of rebellion against oppression, throughout the series (especially in America and Europe) reinforces this view. Scholars such as Stephen Behrend have stressed the mutual interdependence of the series pointing out the subject of slavery as a recurrent motive. David V. Erdman called the Continental Prophecies a "spiritual history of the world".

Each of the works deal with satire, with a particular focus on Francis Bacon, Isaac Newton, and John Locke as a Cerberus figure when he attacked all three. Although Blake was wrong when he labeled Locke a deist, he was not incorrect to find many similarities between Locke's views and deism. However, there were many similar beliefs between the two that Blake does not mention: their opposition to slavery, their promotion of toleration, and the view that the senses are primary to knowledge. As for Bacon, Blake claimed that he was a non-believer. However, Blake did not have access to some of Bacon's works dealing with allegory that, though Blake would not agree with, would have removed the original claims. When Blake labeled Newton as a deist, he ridiculed Newton's works and interest in the apocalyptic.

Blake's specific criticism of individuals is based on the type of threat he believed they posed, especially when a work uses true beliefs but in a misleading manner. While Blake was opposed to Hobbes view, he believed that the straightforwardness of the view were not as dangerous as Locke's arguments were more persuasive to others. In the same way, Blake attacked Swedenborg instead of attacking those like Augustine or Calvin who also promote the belief of predestination that Blake was strongly against. As for general beliefs, Blake felt that there was more to fear from deism than atheism, as deism was more persuasive and dangerous. This view is transformed into Blake's works as the contraries and the negations, with contrariness being represented as devil/angel. As such, Locke is a contrary to Blake, as they both use the same system but in different manners, whereas Hobbes merely negates Blake's view by not caring to use the system.

== See also ==
- William Blake's prophetic books
- Illuminated manuscript
- William Blake's mythology
- Slavery
