= The Book of Los =

1795 book by William Blake

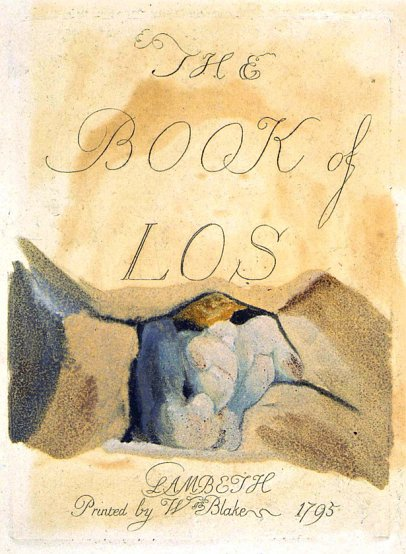
Title page to The Book of Los, 1795. Intaglio engraving with monoprint colouring. In the collection of the British Museum

The Book of Los is a 1795 prophetic book by the English poet and painter William Blake. It exists in only one copy, now held by The British Museum. The book is related to the Book of Urizen and to the Continental prophecies; it is essentially a retelling of Urizen from the point of view of Los. The book has been described as a rewriting of the ancient myth of creation that equates fall with the loss of spiritual vision brought about by selfhood.

== Background ==
During autumn 1790, Blake moved to Lambeth, Surrey. He had a studio at the new house that he used while writing what were later called his "Lambeth Books", which included The Book of Los in 1795. Like the others under the title, all aspects of the work, including the composition of the designs, the printing of them, the colouring of them, and the selling of them, happened at his home. The Book of Los was one of the few works that Blake describes as "illuminated printing", one of his colour printed works with the coloured ink being placed on the copperplate before being printed.

Both The Book of Los and The Book of Ahania were the same size, produced at the same time, and were probably etched on opposing sides of the same copper-plates. Both works were the only ones by Blake to have intaglio etchings instead of relief etchings. Likewise, both works were colour-printed, where the various coloured inks were directly applied to the etching instead of added in later.

== Poem ==
The story describes how Los fell and how he was given a human form. After the events of The Book of Ahania, Los grants Urizen a human form:

Upfolding his Fibres together
To a Form of impregnable strength
Los astonish'd and terrified, built
Furnaces; he formed an Anvil
A Hammer of adamant then began
The binding of Urizen day and night
...
[...].till a Form
Was completed, a Human Illusion
In darkness and deep clouds involvd.

— Chapter IV, stanzas 2 and 9b (Plate 5, lines 18-23, 55-57)

== Themes ==
The Book of Los, along with The Book of Ahania, serves as an experimental revision of The Book of Urizen. The Book of Los, last of the "Lambeth Books", goes back to The Book of Urizen to analyse both the self and the nature of the prophet-priest. The story's relationship to The Book of Urizen parallels the Book of Genesis as the second chapter is a retelling of the first under a new perspective. The poem starts at the fourth chapter in The Book of Urizen. Within the work, Los is bound and is forced to watch the world and the fallen Urizen. Los, struggling against desire and his prison, creates only problems for him and he is trapped in a manner similar to Urizen.

The point of both The Book of Urizen and the retelling in The Book of Los is to describe how Newtonian reason and view of the universe traps the imagination. In the Newtonian belief, the material universe is connected through an unconscious power, which, in turn, characterises imagination and intellect as accidental aspects that result from this. Additionally, imagination and intelligence have a secondary place to force. This early version of a survival-of-the-fittest universe is connected to a fallen world of tyranny and murder in Blake's view. The work also describes evolutionary states and Los's relationship with creation. Los is part of the fallen world as the fire of imaginative energy and falls when he becomes mechanical and regular. Los is the creator of life systems and of the sexes, which leads to the creation of his partner Enitharmon. Eventually, human forms are created after consciousness appears, and Orc is born as an evolution of life.

Throughout the work, Blake relies on elision in a manner similar to Biblical prophecies in order to emphasise the prophetic nature of the work. This emphasis allows for discussion on the relationship of the prophet-bard figure and the druid-priest figure, his opposite. The work also emphasises the language of revelation and how Biblical prophecy operates. Los, as the prophetic figure, is not trying to bring people to God in the Biblical sense, but is instead opposed to the creator figure Urizen. The emphasis within his prophetic ideas is on the divine aspects within humanity and that desire is part of the divine aspect instead of being sinful. As such, Blake reverses the seven deadly sins while claiming that standard morality actually creates more problems than it fixes. Once fallen, Los tries to overcome desire and is forced by these actions into a state similar to Urizen's own. As such, he degenerates from the form of a prophet to a priestly slave. The poem describes how the prophet must struggle against a force while also trying to resist it himself, an idea that reappears in The Four Zoas.

== Critical response ==
Allan Cunningham, a friend of Blake's, claimed "the merit or the fault of surpassing all human comprehension ... what he meant by them even his wife declared she could not tell, though she was sure they had a meaning, and a fine one" and that "it is not a little fearful to look upon; a powerful, dark, terrible, though undefined and indescribable, impression is left on the mind—and it is in no haste to be gone".

In 2002, Jon Mee claimed that "The Book of Los is perhaps the most opaque of all the work Blake produced in the 1790s." G. E. Bentley, in 2003, stated that the book "seems to many today to be one of the most succinct and powerful of Blake's mythological works" and that it "apparently surpassed the comprehension of all his contemporaries, even of his wife."
