= French River, Victoria, Nova Scotia =

Community in Nova Scotia, Canada

Coordinates: 46°29′33″N 60°26′37″W

French River in Nova Scotia

French River is a community in the Canadian province of Nova Scotia, located in Victoria County on Cape Breton Island.
