= Europe a Prophecy =

1794 book by William Blake

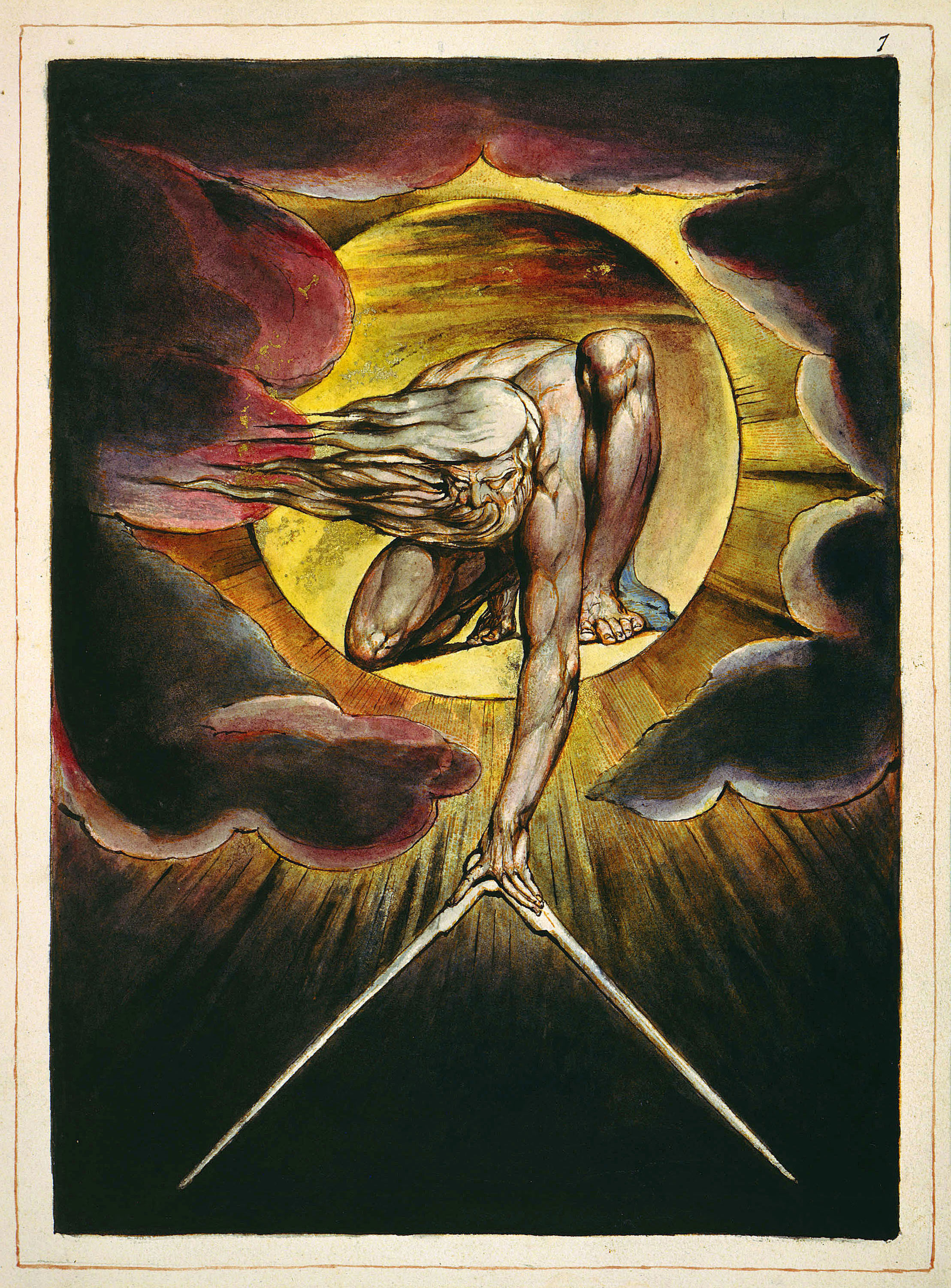
The Ancient of Days, frontispiece to Europe a Prophecy. This is from copy K, in the collection of the Fitzwilliam Museum, Cambridge.

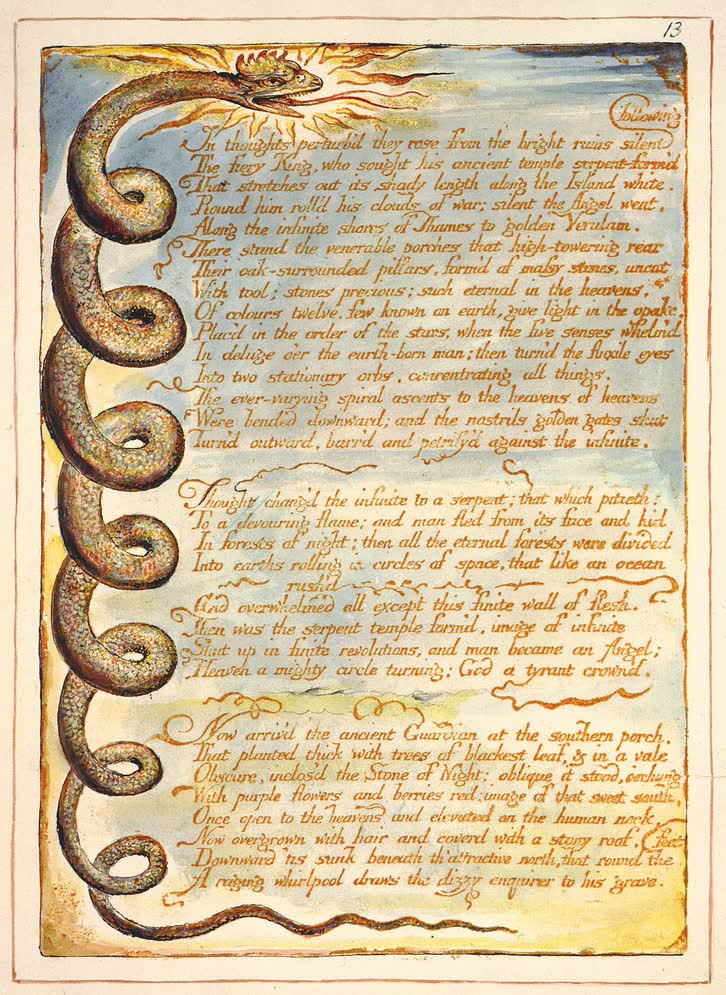
This is from copy K, in the collection of the Fitzwilliam Museum, Plate 13

Europe a Prophecy is a 1794 prophetic book by the British poet and illustrator William Blake. It is engraved on 18 plates, and survives in just nine known copies. It followed America a Prophecy of 1793.

== Background ==
During autumn 1790, Blake moved to Lambeth, in inner London. He had a studio at the new house that he used while writing what were later called his "Lambeth Books", which included Europe in 1794. Like the others in the series, the work was composed, printed, coloured and sold at his house itself. Early sketches for Europe were included in a notebook that contained images were created between 1790 until 1793. Only a few of Blake's works were fully coloured, and only some of the editions of Europe were coloured.

When Europe was printed, it was in the same format as Blake's America and sold for the same price. It was printed between 1794 and 1821 with only 9 copies of the work surviving. The plates used for the designs were 23 x 17 cm in size. In addition to the illuminations, the work contained 265 lines of poetry, which were organized into septenaries. Henry Crabb Robinson contacted William Upcott on 19 April 1810 inquiring about copies of Blake's works that were in his possession. On that day, Robinson was allowed access to Europe and America and created a transcription of the works. A copy of the frontispiece, The Ancient of Days, made for Frederick Tatham, was the final work Blake completed, finishing it just three days prior to his death in 1827.

== Poem ==
The book is prefaced by an image known as The Ancient of Days, a depiction of Urizen separating light and darkness. The poem begins with a description of the source for the vision:

I'll sing to you to this soft lute; and shew you all alive
The world, when every particle of dust breathes forth its joy.

— Plate iii, lines 17-18

The poem then explains that it is about:

Now comes the night of Enitharmons joy!
Who shall I call? Who shall I send?
That Woman, lovely Woman! may have dominion?
...
Go! tell the human race that Womans love is Sin!
That an Eternal life awaits the worms of sixty winters
In an allegorical abode where existence hath never come:

— Plate 5, lines 1-3, 5-7

The poem describes the creation of the serpent:

Thought chang'd the infinite to a serpent; that which pitieth:
To a devouring flame; and man fled from its face and hid
...
Then was the serpent temple form'd, image of infinite
Shut up in finite revolutions, and man became an Angel;
Heaven a mighty circle turning; God a tyrant crown'd.

— Plate 10, lines 16-17, 21-23

The poem concludes with Los calling his sons to arms:

But terrible Orc, when he beheld the morning in the east,
Shot from the heights of Enitharmon;
And in the vineyards of red France appear'd the light of his fury.
...
Then Los arose his head he reared in snaky thunders clad:
And with a cry that shook all nature to the utmost pole,
Call'd all his sons to the strife of blood.

— Plate 14, line 37, Plate 15 lines 1-2, 9-11

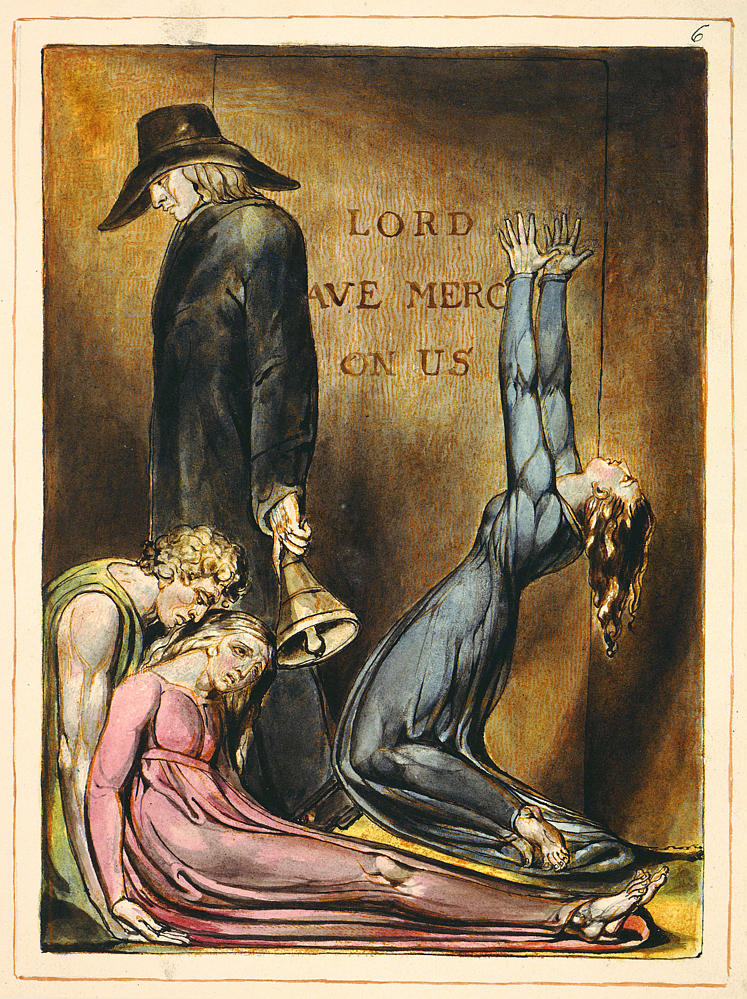
Plate six of Europe a Prophecy, copy K. The poem envisions a world filled with suffering, with imagery connected to the politics of 1790s Britain

== Themes ==
Europe, like many of Blake's other works, is a mythological narrative and is considered a "prophecy". However, only America and Europe were ever given that title by Blake. He understood the word not to denote a description of the future, but the view of the honest and the wise. The vision within the poem, along with some of the other prophecies, is of a world filled with suffering in a manner that is connected to the politics of 1790s Britain.

God in The Ancient of Days is a "nous" figure, a creative principle in the universe that establishes mathematical order and permanence that allows life to keep from becoming nothingness. In such a view, Jesus is seen as a Logos figure that is disconnected from the nous in that Logos constantly recreates what is beautiful. As such, Jesus, as well as the Holy Spirit, are connected in Blake's mythology to the image of the universal man as opposed to God the Father. The image is also connected to John Milton's Paradise Lost in which God uses a golden compass to circumscribe the universe. Blake's version does not create the Garden of Eden but instead is creating the serpent of the poem's frontispiece. The image is also connected to a vision Blake witnessed at the steps inside of his home. There are parallels between the actions of women within Europe and the 1820s images titled Drawings for The Book of Enoch. The latter work describes the seduction of the Watchers of Heaven by the Daughters of Men; giants born of their union then proceed to ravage the land. Both works emphasise the dominance of women.

Blake had many expectations for the French Revolution, which is described in a prophetic way within the poem. However, he was disappointed when the fallen state of existence returned without the changes that Blake had hoped. To Blake, the French promoted a bad idea of reason, and he was disappointed when there was not a sensual liberation. After Napoleon declared himself emperor in 1804, Blake believed that the revolutionary heroes were instead being treated as god kings that no longer cared about freedom. He continued to believe in an apocalyptic state that would soon appear, but he no longer believed that Orc man, the leader of a revolution, would be the agent of the apocalypse. Instead, he believed that God could only exist in men, and he distrusted all hero worship.

== Critical response ==
Robinson wrote an essay about Blake's works in 1810 and described Europe and America as "mysterious and incomprehensible rhapsody". Blake's fame grew in 1816 with an entry in A Biographical Dictionary of the Living Authors of Great Britain and Ireland, which included Europe among the works of "an eccentric but very ingenious artist".

Northrop Frye regarded it as Blake's "greatest achievement" in "a kind of 'free verse' recitativo in which the septenarius is mixed with lyrical meters." According to John Beer: "The drift of the argument in Europe is to show how a Christian message that has been veiled, and cults exalting virginity, have together fostered the so-called Enlightenment philosophy which left no place for the visionary."

== Legacy ==
The title page of Europe a Prophecy was adapted for the cover of cultural critic Elizabeth Sandifer's 2017 book Neoreaction a Basilisk: Essays on and Around the Alt Right. The book is a critique of 21st-century proponents of the Dark Enlightenment and their influence on the PayPal Mafia and the alt-right movement.
