= French River, Pictou County =

Community in Nova Scotia, Canada

Coordinates: 45°34′24.81″N 62°25′36.81″W

French River in Nova Scotia

French River is a community in the Canadian province of Nova Scotia, located in Pictou County.
