= French River, Colchester County =

Community in Nova Scotia, Canada

Coordinates: 45°43′10.14″N 63°22′24.97″W

French River in Nova Scotia

French River is an unincorporated community in the Canadian province of Nova Scotia, located in Colchester County. The community is located approximately 3 km south-west of Tatamagouche.
