= Visions of the Daughters of Albion =

1793 poem by William Blake

Visions of the Daughters of Albion is a 1793 poem by William Blake, produced as a book with his own illustrations. The edition was very small, and copies have been individually traced. It is a short and early example of his prophetic books, and a sequel of sorts to The Book of Thel.

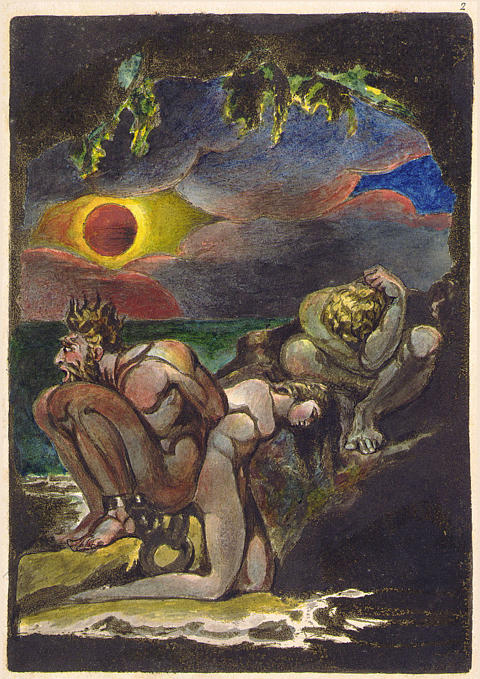
Frontispiece to William Blake's Visions of the Daughters of Albion (1793), which contains Blake's critique of Abrahamic values of marriage.

== Plot ==
The central narrative is of the female character Oothoon, called the "soft soul of America", and of her sexual experience. S. Foster Damon (A Blake Dictionary) suggested that Blake had been influenced by Mary Wollstonecraft's A Vindication of the Rights of Woman, published in 1792.

Oothoon is in love with Theotormon, who represents the chaste man, filled with a false sense of righteousness. Oothoon desires Theotormon but is suddenly, violently raped by Bromion. After Oothoon is raped neither Bromion nor Theotormon want anything to do with her.

== Symbolism ==
As is usual in Blake, the names of the characters represent their symbolic roles. Theotormon's name is derived from the Greek theos, which means "god", and the Latin tormentum, which means "twist" or "torment". The name of his rival Bromion is Greek meaning "roarer". (Note: Bromion is a title used for Dionysos; it means the "loud-roarer".)

Bromion represents the passionate man, filled with lustful fire. Oothoon is the representation of a woman in Blake's society, who had no charge over her own sexuality. Blake has the Daughters of Albion look to the West, to America, because he believed that there was a promise in America that would one day end all forms of discrimination. It was to be in America, that races would live in harmony, and women would be able to claim their own sexuality. At the same time, Blake recognizes that though America has freed itself from British rule, it continues to practice slavery.

Blake used Plato's Allegory of the Cave in Visions of the Daughters of Albion as a theme for the three characters not being able to understand the true nature of reality, without being hindered by convention. It has been argued that Theotormon is a mythicised version of John Stedman, whose book about his experience of slavery and brutality in Suriname on the coast of South America was being illustrated by Blake at the time.
