= Brim =

Brim may refer to:

== People ==
- Elizabeth Brim, American blacksmith
- Emperor Brim (died 1733), Muscogee mico war chief
- Georgij Robertovich Brim (1935−1999), Soviet/Azerbaijani educator
- Brady Brim-DeForest (born 1980), American philanthropist and business executive
- John Brim (1922–2003), American Chicago blues guitarist, songwriter and singer
- Katerina Brim (born 1998), American Para-cyclist
- Mike Brim (1966–2005), American football player
- Orville Gilbert Brim Jr. (c. 1923–2016), American psychologist
- Steelo Brim (born 1988), American television personality
- Brim Fuentes, American graffiti artist

== Places ==
- Brim, Victoria, a town in Australia
- Brim Fell, a fell in the English Lake District
- Brim River, a river in British Columbia, Canada

== Other uses ==
- Brim (hat), projection of stiff material from the bottom of a hat's crown
- Bream or brim, several species of freshwater and marine
- Undercurrent (2010 film) (Icelandic: Brim), an award-winning 2010 Icelandic film
- A former brand of decaffeinated coffee; see Maxwell House; since re-introduced as a low-acid traditional coffee
- Brim hf., Icelandic fishing and fish processing company

== See also ==
- Brims (disambiguation)
- Brimer (disambiguation)
- Brimmer, a surname
