= Blacksmith =

Metalworking occupation

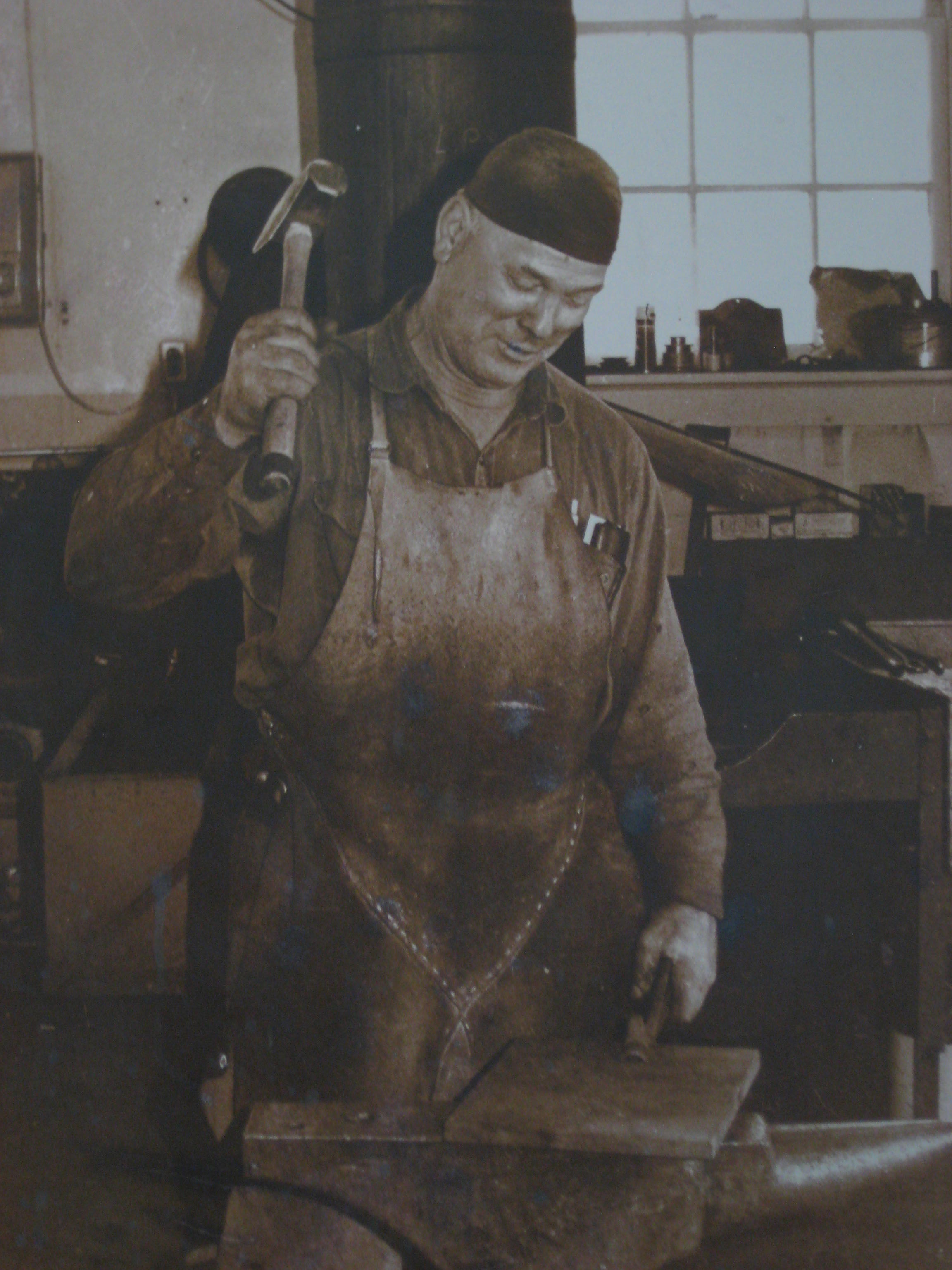
- Picture of Vince J. Heilman (1918–2000) taken by the local newspaper around 1970

Occupation
- Occupation type: Profession
- Activity sectors: Vocation

Description
- Competencies: Physical strength, conceptualization
- Fields of employment: Artist, Craftsman
- Related jobs: Farrier

A blacksmith is a metalsmith who creates objects primarily from wrought iron or steel, but sometimes from other metals, by forging the metal, using tools to hammer, bend, and cut (cf. tinsmith). Blacksmiths produce objects such as gates, grilles, railings, light fixtures, furniture, sculpture, tools, agricultural implements, decorative and religious items, cooking utensils, and weapons. There was a historical distinction between the heavy work of the blacksmith and the more delicate operations of a whitesmith, who usually worked in gold, silver, pewter, or the finishing steps of fine steel. The place where a blacksmith works is variously called a smithy, a forge, or a blacksmith's shop.

While there are many professions who work with metal, such as farriers, wheelwrights, and armorers, in former times the blacksmith had a general knowledge of how to make and repair many things, from the most complex of weapons and armor to simple things like nails or lengths of chain.

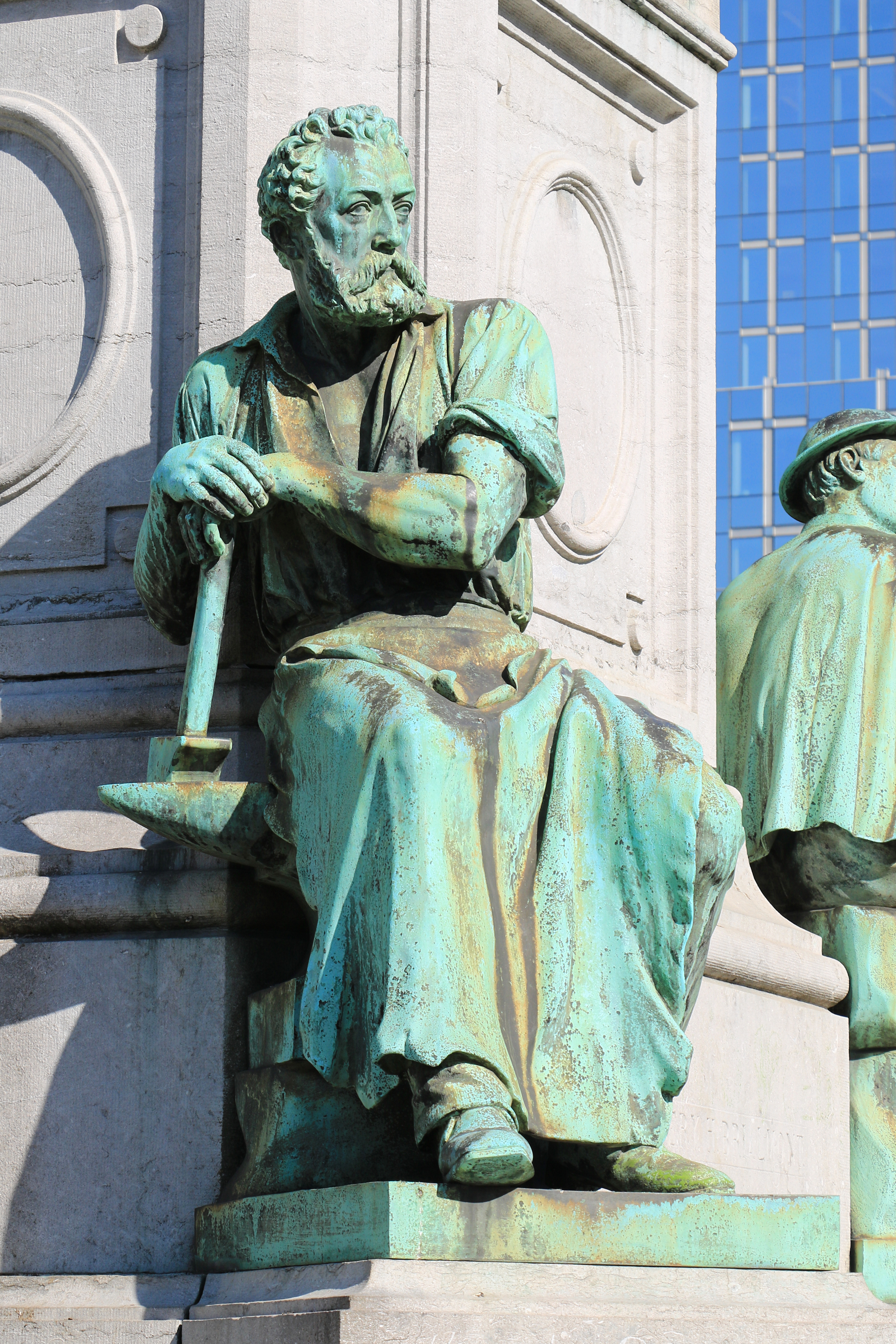
Statue of a blacksmith (Monument to John Cockerill in Brussels).

== Etymology ==
The "black" in "blacksmith" refers to the black firescale, a layer of oxides that forms on the surface of the metal during heating. The origin of smith is the Old English word smið meaning "blacksmith", originating from the Proto-Germanic *smiþaz meaning "skilled worker".

== Smithing process ==
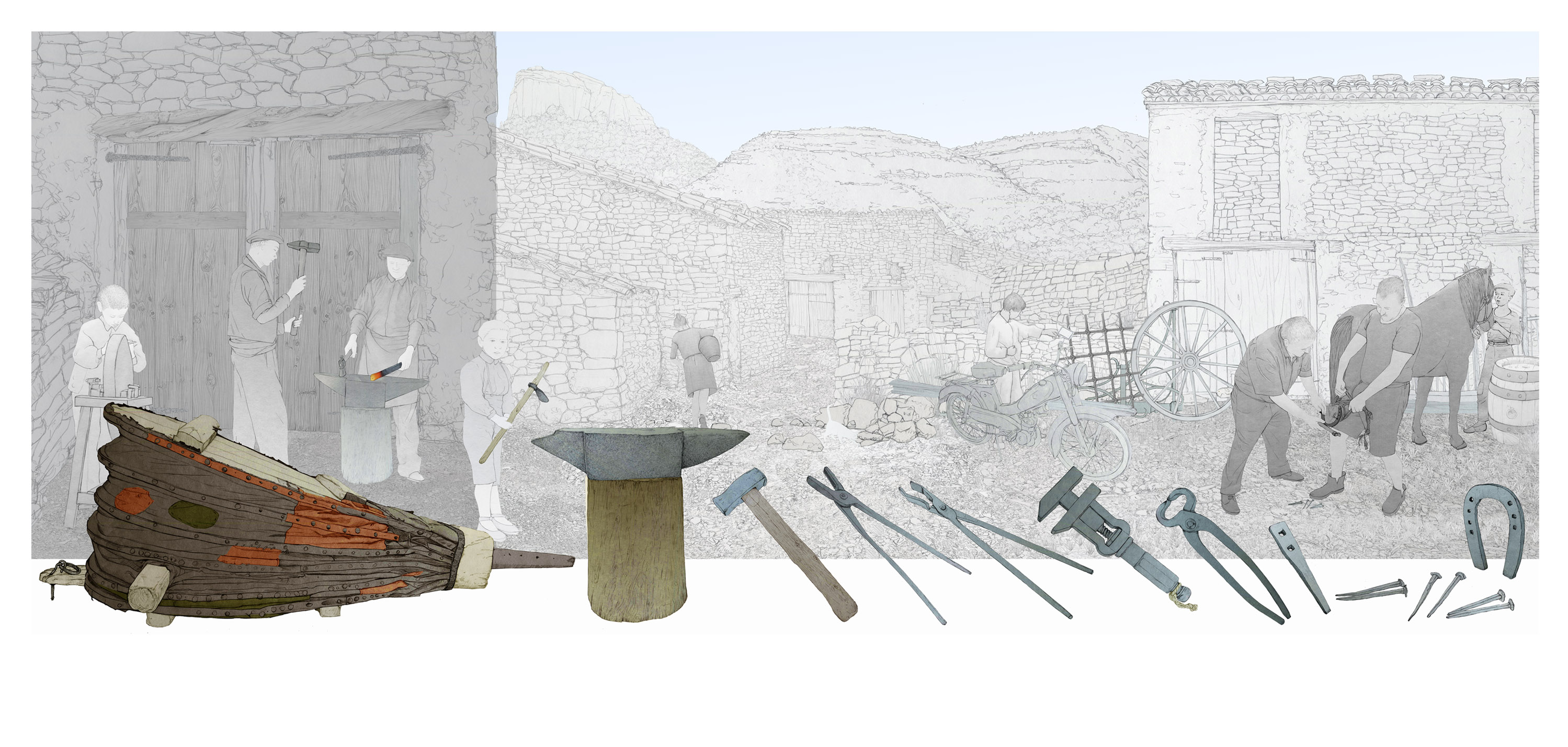
Smithing process in Mediterranean environment, Valencian Museum of Ethnology

Blacksmiths work by heating pieces of wrought iron or steel until the metal becomes soft enough for shaping with hand tools, such as a hammer, an anvil and a chisel. Heating generally takes place in a forge fueled by propane, natural gas, coal, charcoal, coke, or oil.

Some modern blacksmiths may also employ an oxyacetylene or similar blowtorch for more localized heating. Induction heating methods are gaining popularity among modern blacksmiths.

Color is important for indicating the temperature and workability of the metal. As iron heats to higher temperatures, it first glows red, then orange, yellow, and finally white. The ideal heat for most forging is the bright yellow-orange color that indicates forging heat. Because they must be able to see the glowing color of the metal, some blacksmiths work in dim, low-light conditions, but most work in well-lit conditions. The key is to have consistent lighting, but not too bright. Direct sunlight obscures the colors.

The techniques of smithing can be roughly divided into forging (sometimes called "sculpting"), welding, heat-treating, and finishing.

=== Forging ===
A blacksmith hand-forging a tool during the Acampamento Farroupilha event in Porto Alegre, Brazil, 2015.

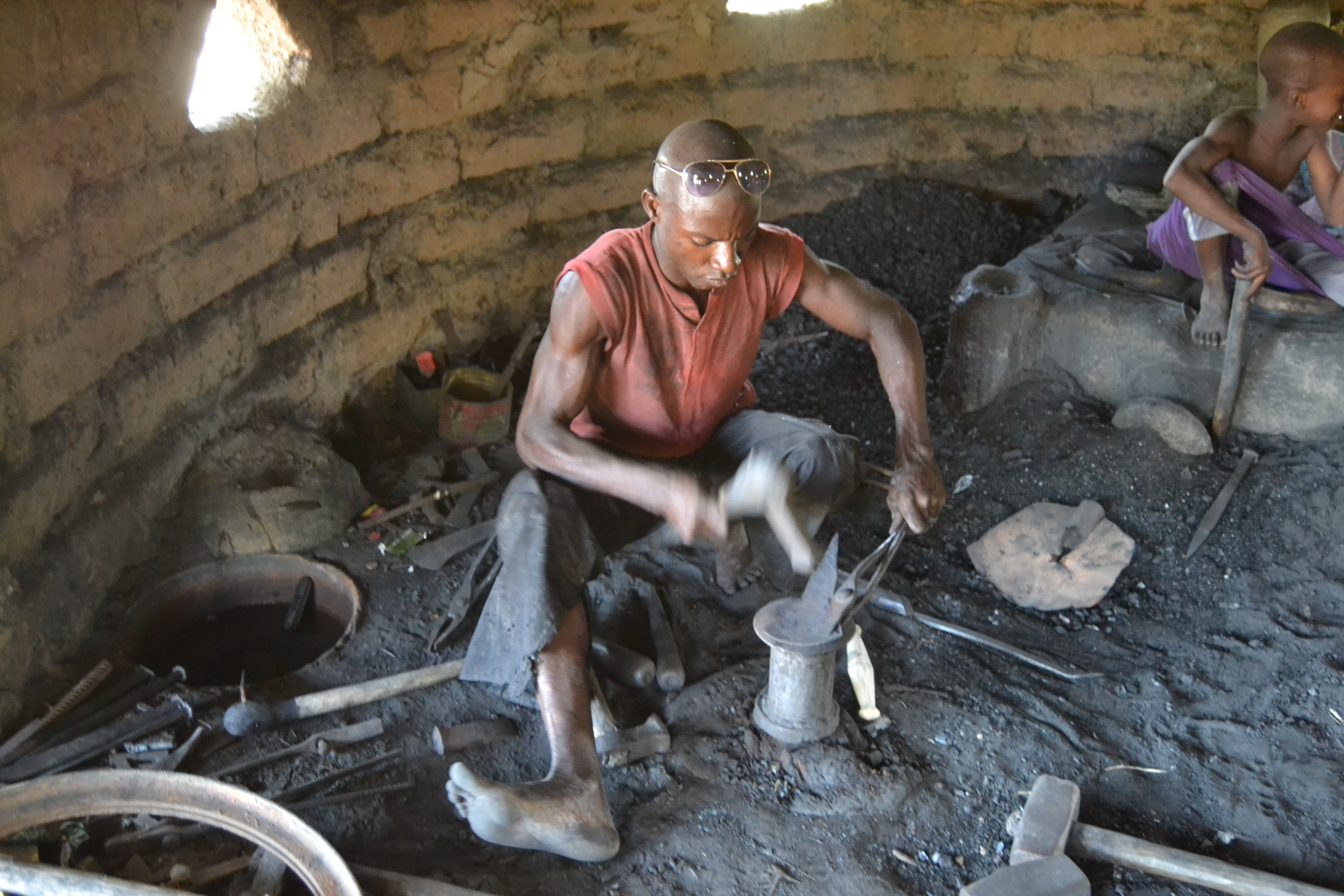
A blacksmith

Forging—the process smiths use to shape metal by hammering—differs from machining in that forging does not remove material. Instead, the smith hammers the iron into shape. Even punching and cutting operations (except when trimming waste) by smiths usually re-arrange metal around the hole, rather than drilling it out as swarf.

Forging uses seven basic operations or techniques:

- Drawing down
- Shrinking (a type of upsetting)
- Bending
- Upsetting
- Swaging
- Punching
- Forge welding

These operations generally require at least a hammer and anvil, but smiths also use other tools and techniques to accommodate odd-sized or repetitive jobs.

==== Drawing ====
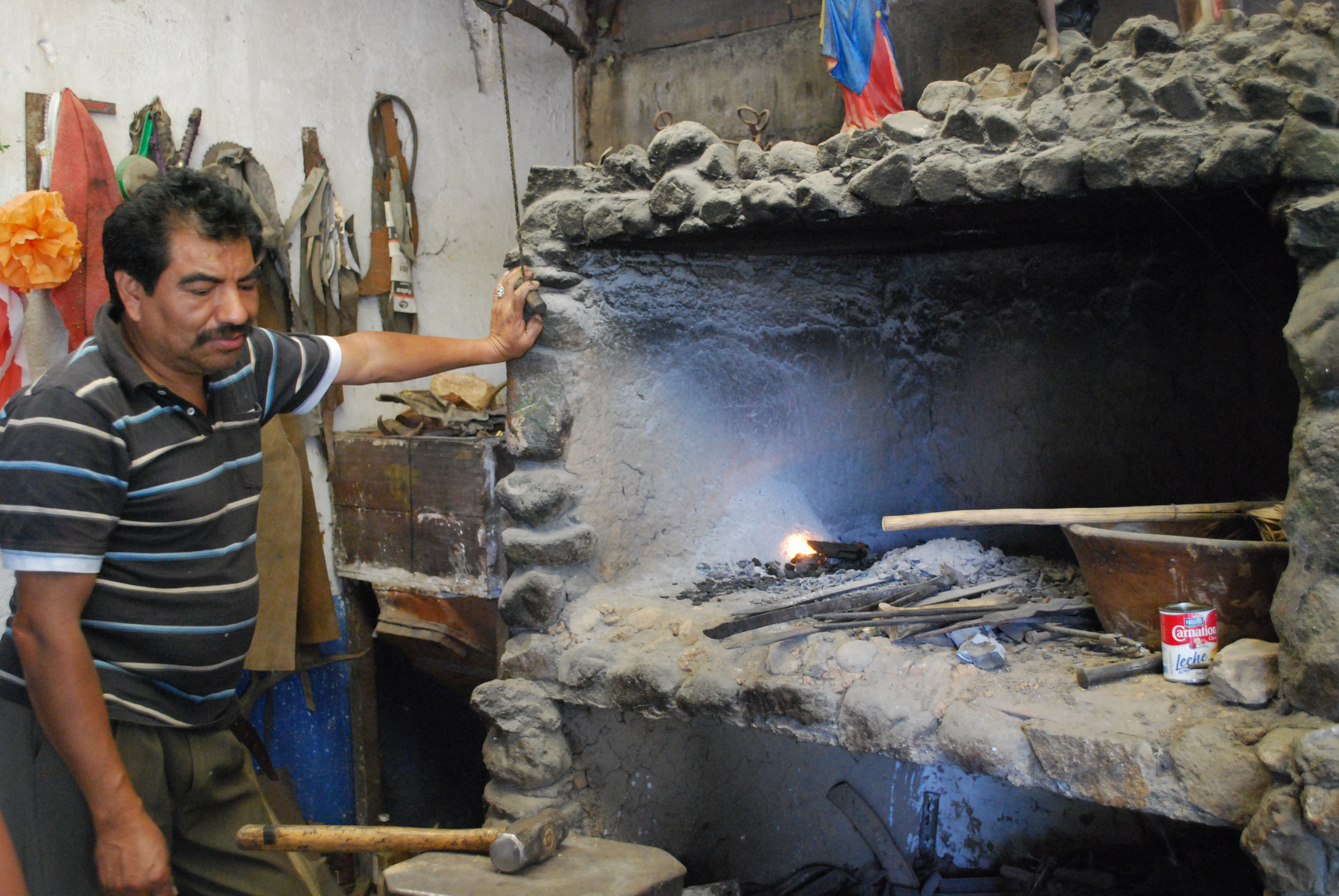
Blacksmith Apolinar Aguilar at the furnace of his blade workshop in Ocotlan de Morelos, Oaxaca, Mexico

Drawing lengthens the metal by reducing one or both of the other two dimensions. As the depth is reduced, or the width narrowed, the piece is lengthened or "drawn out."

As an example of drawing, a smith making a chisel might flatten a square bar of steel, lengthening the metal, reducing its depth but keeping its width consistent.

Drawing does not have to be uniform. A taper can result as in making a wedge or a woodworking chisel blade. If tapered in two dimensions, a point results.

Drawing can be accomplished with a variety of tools and methods. Two typical methods using only hammer and anvil would be hammering on the anvil horn, and hammering on the anvil face using the cross peen of a hammer.

Another method for drawing is to use a tool called a fuller, or the peen of the hammer, to hasten the drawing out of a thick piece of metal. (The technique is called fullering from the tool.) Fullering consists of hammering a series of indentations with corresponding ridges, perpendicular to the long section of the piece being drawn. The resulting effect looks somewhat like waves along the top of the piece. Then the smith turns the hammer over to use the flat face to hammer the tops of the ridges down level with the bottoms of the indentations. This forces the metal to grow in length (and width if left unchecked) much faster than just hammering with the flat face of the hammer.

=== Bending ===
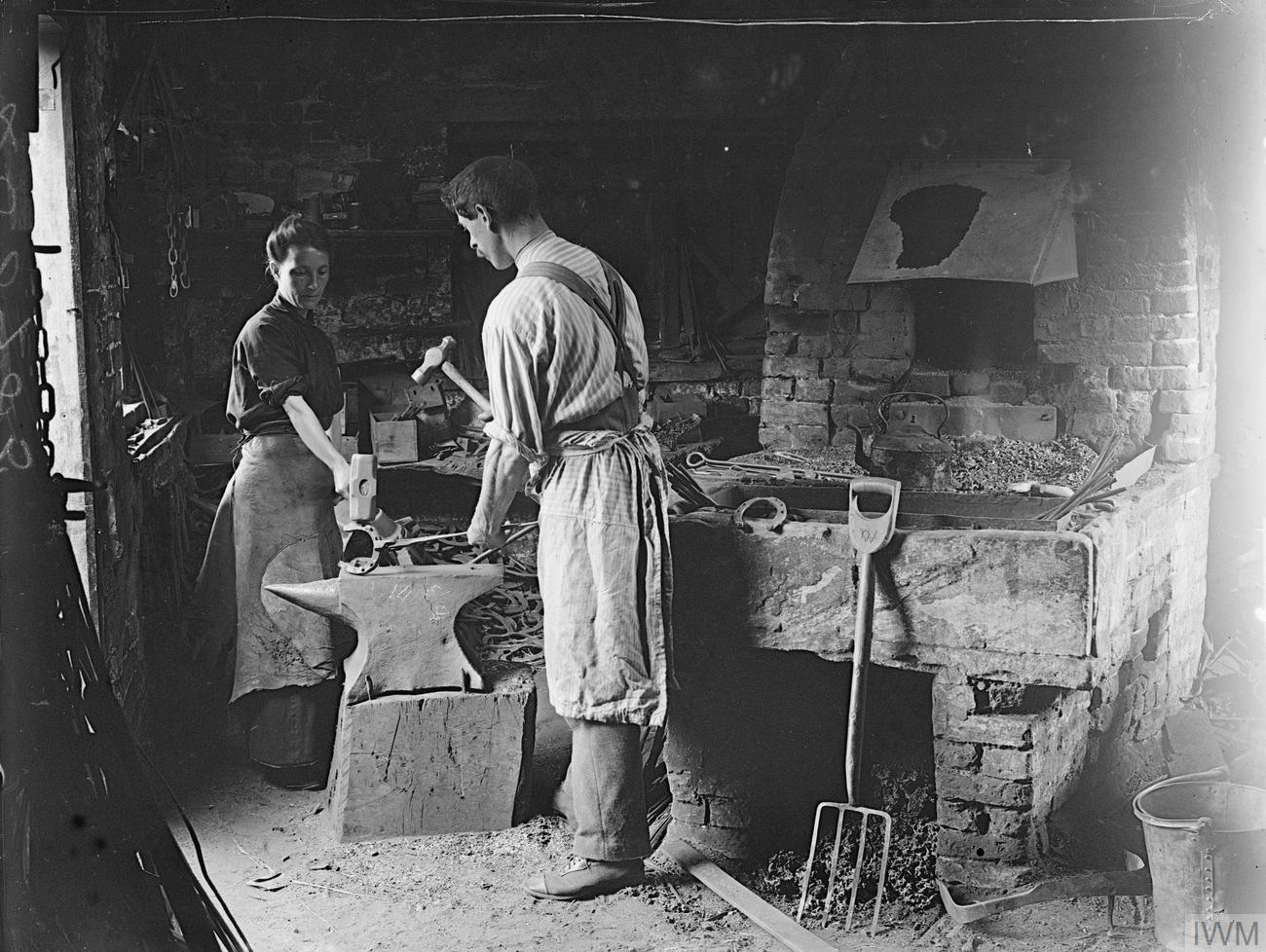
A horseshoe being bent into shape

Heating iron to a "forging heat" allows bending as if it were a soft, ductile metal, like copper or silver.

Bending can be done with the hammer over the horn or edge of the anvil or by inserting a bending fork into the hardy hole (the square hole in the top of the anvil), placing the work piece between the tines of the fork, and bending the material to the desired angle. Bends can be dressed and tightened, or widened, by hammering them over the appropriately shaped part of the anvil.

Some metals are "hot short", meaning they lose their tensile strength when heated. They become like Plasticine: although they may still be manipulated by squeezing, an attempt to stretch them, even by bending or twisting, is likely to have them crack and break apart. This is a problem for some blade-making steels, which must be worked carefully to avoid developing hidden cracks that would cause failure in the future. Though rarely hand-worked, titanium is notably hot short. Even such common smithing processes as decoratively twisting a bar are impossible with it.

=== Upsetting ===
Upsetting is the process of making metal thicker in one dimension through shortening in the other. One form is to heat the end of a rod and then hammer on it as one would drive a nail: the rod gets shorter, and the hot part widens. An alternative to hammering on the hot end is to place the hot end on the anvil and hammer on the cold end.

=== Punching ===
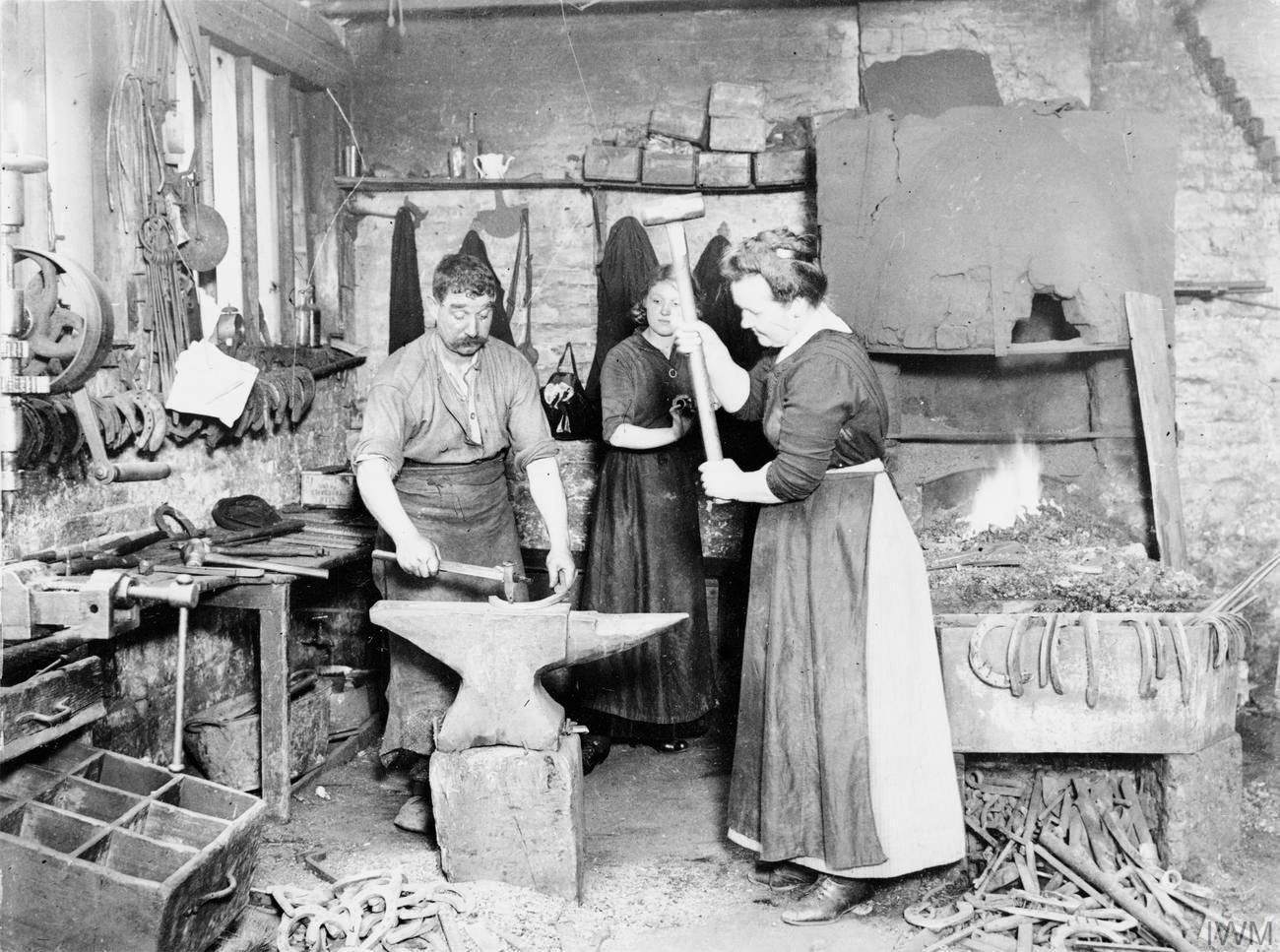
A blacksmith using an eye punch to make a hole in a horseshoe, August 1916

Punching may be done to create a decorative pattern, or to make a hole. For example, in preparation for making a hammerhead, a smith would punch a hole in a heavy bar or rod for the hammer handle. Punching is not limited to depressions and holes. It also includes cutting, slitting, and drifting—all done with a chisel.

==== Combining processes ====
The five basic forging processes are often combined to produce and refine the shapes necessary for finished products. For example, to fashion a cross-peen hammer head, a smith would start with a bar roughly the diameter of the hammer face: the handle hole would be punched and drifted (widened by inserting or passing a larger tool through it), the head would be cut (punched, but with a wedge), the peen would be drawn to a wedge, and the face would be dressed by upsetting.

As with making a chisel, since it is lengthened by drawing it would also tend to spread in width. A smith would therefore frequently turn the chisel-to-be on its side and hammer it back down—upsetting it—to check the spread and keep the metal at the correct width.

Or, if a smith needed to put a 90-degree bend in a bar and wanted a sharp corner on the outside of the bend, they would begin by hammering an unsupported end to make the curved bend. Then, to "fatten up" the outside radius of the bend, one or both arms of the bend would need to be pushed back to fill the outer radius of the curve. So they would hammer the ends of the stock down into the bend, 'upsetting' it at the point of the bend. They would then dress the bend by drawing the sides of the bend to keep the correct thickness. The hammering would continue—upsetting and then drawing—until the curve had been properly shaped. In the primary operation was the bend, but the drawing and upsetting are done to refine the shape.

=== Welding ===
Welding is the joining of the same or similar kind of metal.

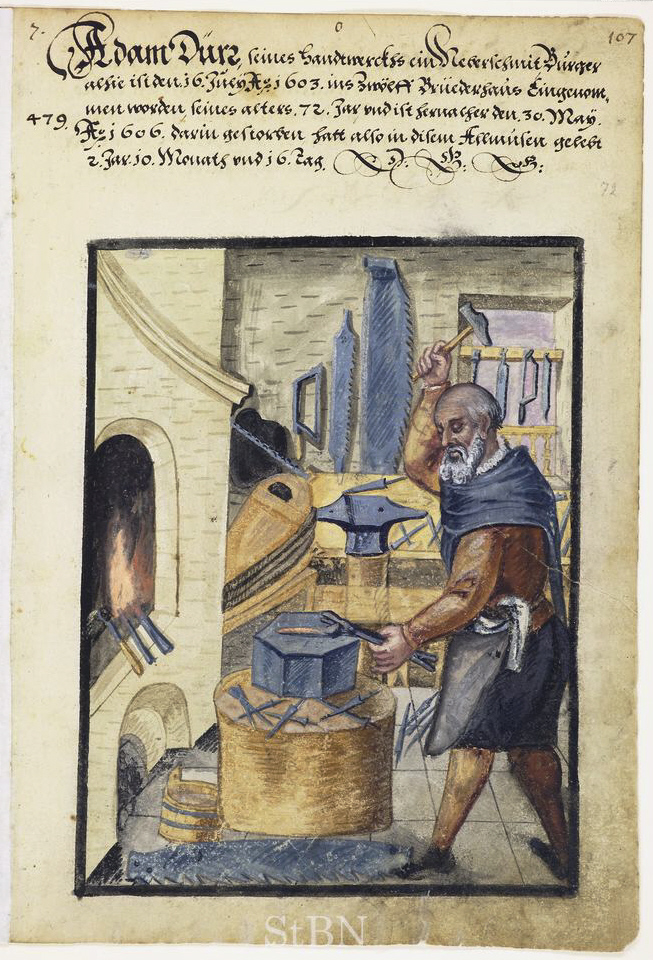
Blacksmith, 1606

A modern blacksmith has a range of options and tools to accomplish this. The basic types of welding commonly employed in a modern workshop include traditional forge welding as well as modern methods, including oxyacetylene and arc welding.

In forge welding, the pieces to join are heated to what is generally referred to as welding heat. For mild steel most smiths judge this temperature by color: the metal glows an intense yellow or white. At this temperature the steel is near molten.

Any foreign material in the weld, such as the oxides or "scale" that typically form in the fire, can weaken it and cause it to fail. Thus the mating surfaces to be joined must be kept clean. To this end a smith makes sure the fire is a reducing fire: a fire where, at the heart, there is a great deal of heat and very little oxygen. The smith also carefully shapes mating faces so that as they come together foreign material squeezes out as the metal is joined. To clean the faces, protect them from oxidation, and provide a medium to carry foreign material out of the weld, the smith sometimes uses flux—typically powdered borax, silica sand, or both.

The smith first cleans parts to be joined with a wire brush, then puts them in the fire to heat. With a mix of drawing and upsetting the smith shapes the faces so that when finally brought together, the center of the weld connects first and the connection spreads outward under the hammer blows, pushing out the flux (if used) and foreign material.

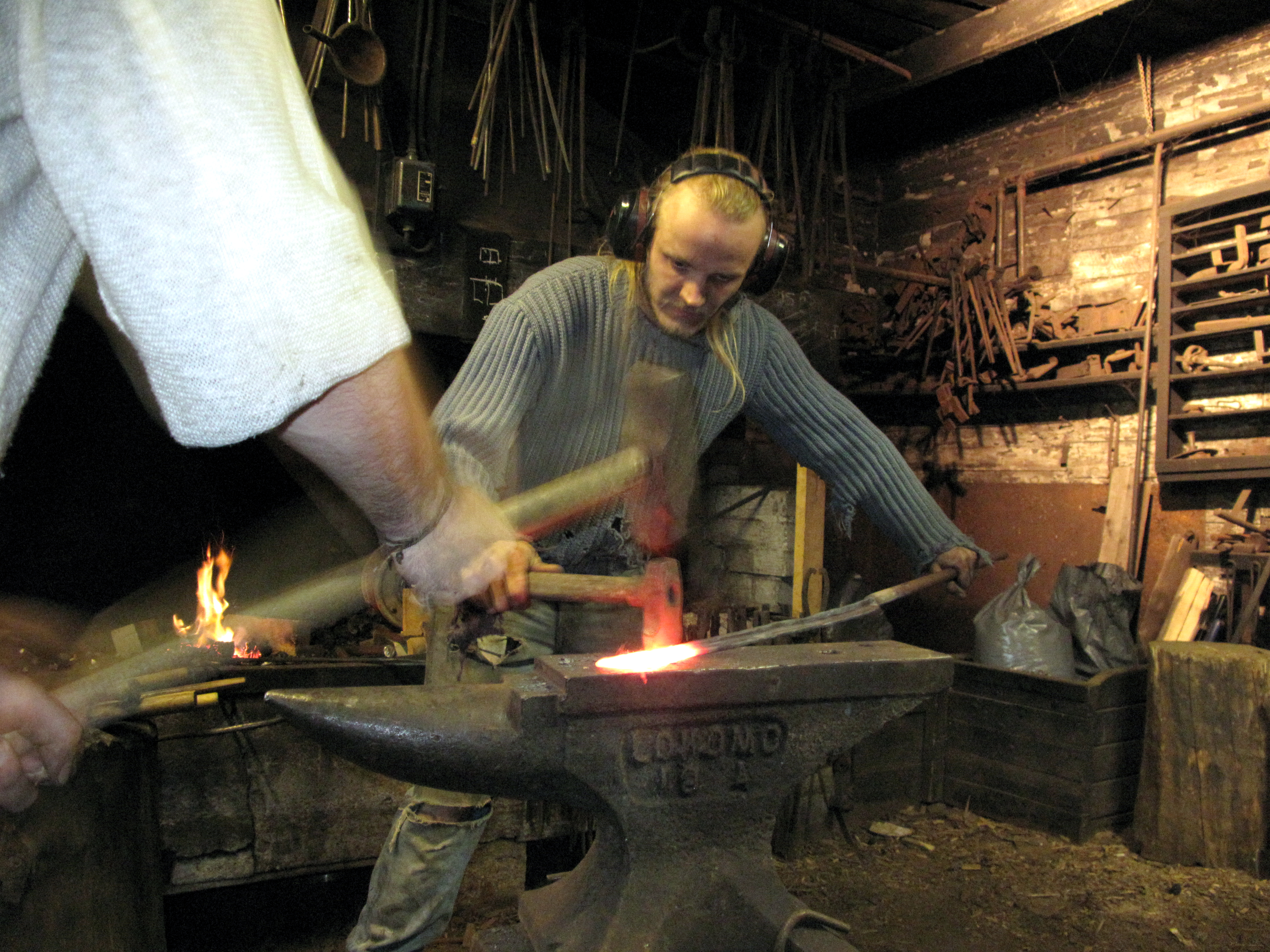
An artist blacksmith and a striker working as one

The dressed metal goes back in the fire, is brought near to welding heat, removed from the fire, and brushed. Flux is sometimes applied, which prevents oxygen from reaching and burning the metal during forging, and it is returned to the fire. The smith now watches carefully to avoid overheating the metal. There is some challenge to this because, to see the color of the metal, the smith must remove it from the fire—exposing it to air, which can rapidly oxidize it. So the smith might probe into the fire with a bit of steel wire, prodding lightly at the mating faces. When the end of the wire sticks on to the metal, it is at the right temperature (a small weld forms where the wire touches the mating face, so it sticks). The smith commonly places the metal in the fire so he can see it without letting surrounding air contact the surface. (Note that smiths don't always use flux, especially in the UK.) Now the smith moves with rapid purpose, quickly taking the metal from the fire to the anvil and bringing the mating faces together. A few light hammer taps bring the mating faces into complete contact and squeeze out the flux—and finally, the smith returns the work to the fire. The weld begins with the taps, but often the joint is weak and incomplete, so the smith reheats the joint to welding temperature and works the weld with light blows to "set" the weld and finally to dress it to the shape.

=== Finishing ===
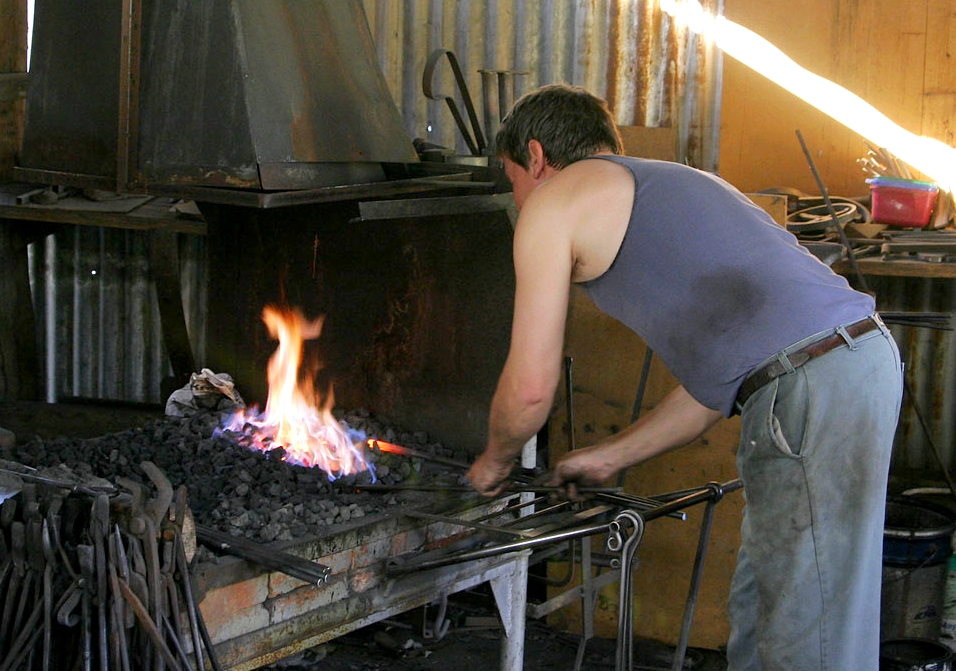
A blacksmith at work

Depending on the intended use of the piece, a blacksmith may finish it in a number of ways:

- A simple jig (a tool) that the smith might only use a few times in the shop may get the minimum of finishing—a rap on the anvil to break off scale and a brushing with a wire brush.
- Files bring a piece to final shape, removing burrs and sharp edges, and smoothing the surface.
- Heat treatment and case-hardening achieve the desired hardness.
- The wire brush—as a hand tool or power tool—can further smooth, brighten, and polish surfaces.
- Grinding stones, abrasive paper, and emery wheels can further shape, smooth, and polish the surface.

A range of treatments and finishes can inhibit oxidation and enhance or change the appearance of the piece. An experienced smith selects the finish based on the metal and on the intended use of the item. Finishes include (among others): paint, varnish, bluing, browning, oil, and wax.

== Blacksmith's striker ==
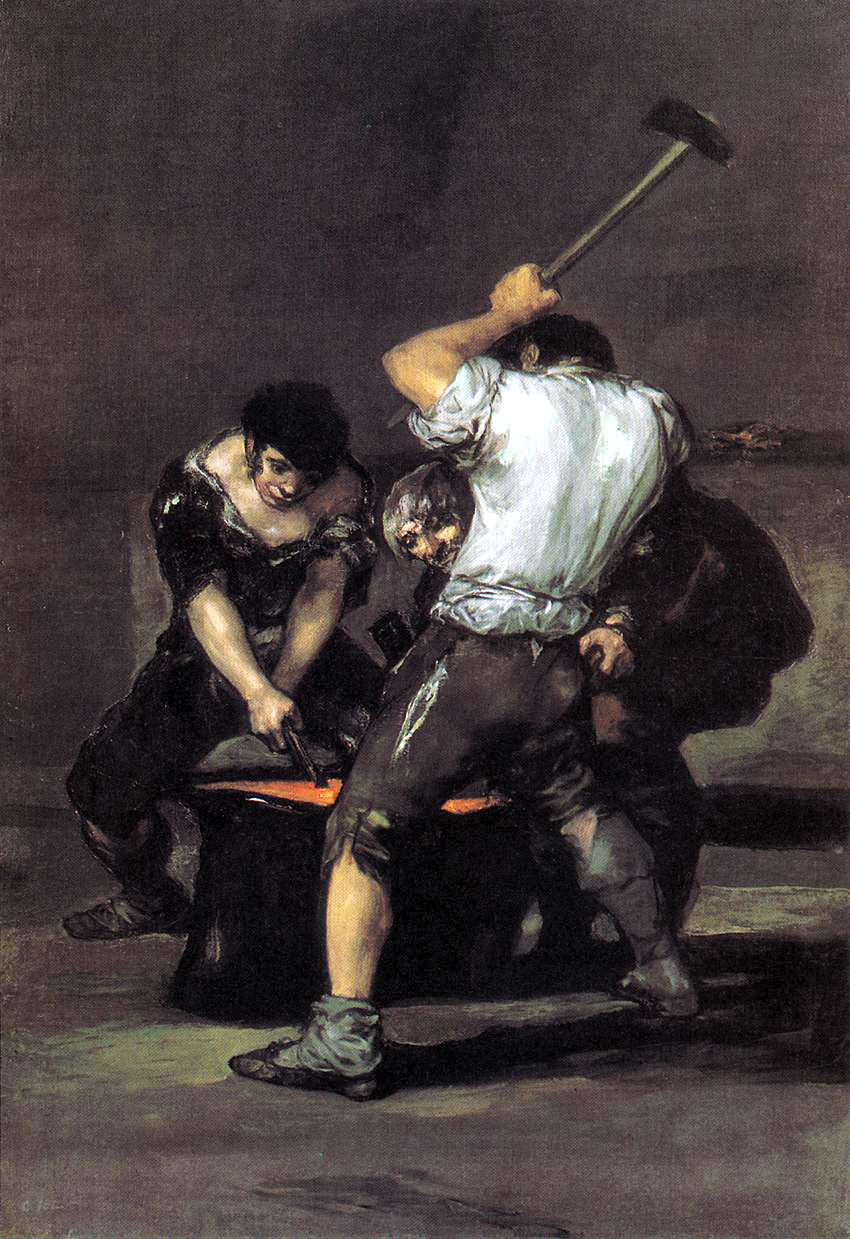
La Fragua (lit. 'The Forge'), c. 1814, by Francisco de Goya

A blacksmith's striker is an assistant (frequently an apprentice) whose job is to swing a large sledgehammer in heavy forging operations, as directed by the blacksmith. In practice, the blacksmith holds the hot iron at the anvil (with tongs) in one hand, and indicates where to strike the iron by tapping it with a small hammer in the other hand. The striker then delivers a heavy blow to the indicated spot with a sledgehammer. During the 20th century and into the 21st century, this role has become increasingly unnecessary and automated through the use of trip hammers or reciprocating power hammers.

== Blacksmith's materials ==
When iron ore is smelted into usable metal, a certain amount of carbon is usually alloyed with the iron. (Charcoal is almost pure carbon.) The amount of carbon significantly affects the properties of the metal. If the carbon content is over 2%, the metal is called cast iron, because it has a relatively low melting point and is easily cast. It is quite brittle, however, and cannot be forged so therefore not used for blacksmithing. If the carbon content is between 0.25% and 2%, the resulting metal is tool steel, which can be heat treated as discussed above. When the carbon content is below 0.25%, the metal is either "wrought iron (wrought iron is not smelted and cannot come from this process) " or "mild steel." The terms are never interchangeable. In preindustrial times, the material of choice for blacksmiths was wrought iron. This iron had a very low carbon content, and also included up to 5% of glassy iron silicate slag in the form of numerous very fine stringers. This slag content made the iron very tough, gave it considerable resistance to rusting, and allowed it to be more easily "forge welded," a process in which the blacksmith permanently joins two pieces of iron, or a piece of iron and a piece of steel, by heating them nearly to a white heat and hammering them together. Forge welding is more difficult with modern mild steel, because it welds in a narrower temperature band. The fibrous nature of wrought iron required knowledge and skill to properly form any tool which would be subject to stress. Modern steel is produced using either the blast furnace or arc furnaces. Wrought iron was produced by a labor-intensive process called puddling, so this material is now a difficult-to-find specialty product. Modern blacksmiths generally substitute mild steel for making objects traditionally of wrought iron. Sometimes they use electrolytic-process pure iron.

== Other metals ==
Many blacksmiths also incorporate materials such as bronze, copper, or brass in artistic products. Aluminum and titanium may also be forged by the blacksmith's process. Bronze is an alloy of copper and tin, while brass is an alloy of copper and zinc. Each material responds differently under the hammer and must be separately studied by the blacksmith.

== Terminology ==
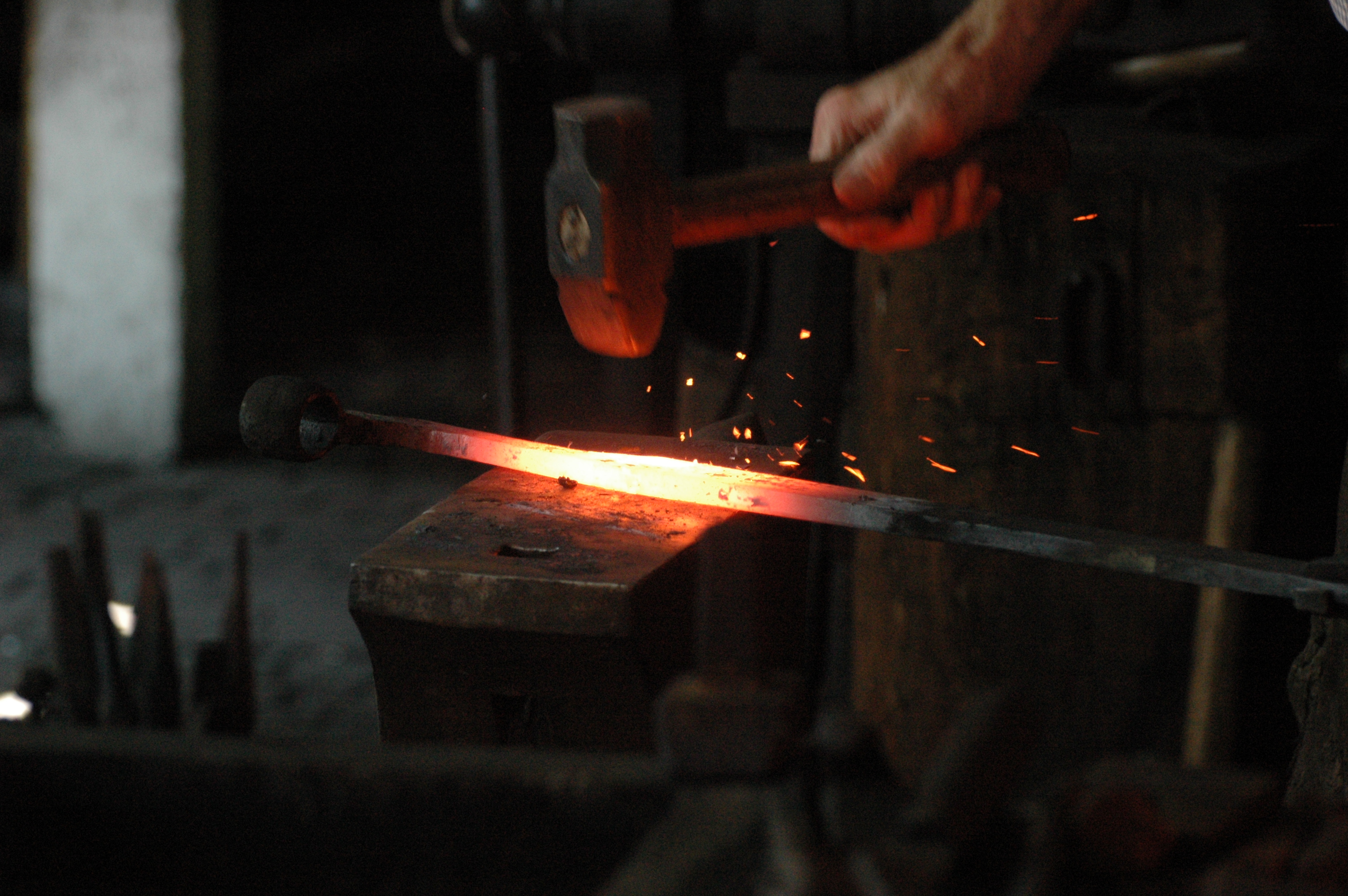
Hot metal work from a blacksmith

- Iron is a naturally occurring metallic element. It is almost never found in its native form (pure iron) in nature. It is usually found as an oxide or sulfide, with many other impurity elements mixed in.
- Wrought iron is the purest form of iron generally encountered or produced in quantity. It may contain as little as 0.04% carbon (by weight). From its traditional method of manufacture, wrought iron has a fibrous internal texture. Quality wrought-iron blacksmithing takes the direction of these fibers into account during forging, since the strength of the material is stronger in line with the grain than across the grain. Most of the remaining impurities from the initial smelting become concentrated in silicate slag trapped between the iron fibers. This slag produces a lucky side effect during forge-welding. When the silicate melts, it makes wrought iron self-fluxing. The slag becomes a liquid glass that covers the exposed surfaces of the wrought iron, preventing oxidation which would otherwise interfere with the successful welding process.
- Steel is an alloy of iron and between 0.3% and 1.7% carbon by weight. The presence of carbon allows steel to assume one of several different crystalline configurations. Macroscopically, this is seen as the ability to "turn the hardness of a piece of steel on and off" through various processes of heat-treatment. If the concentration of carbon is held constant, this is a reversible process. Steel with a higher carbon percentage may be brought to a higher state of maximum hardness.
- Cast iron is iron that contains between 2.0% to 6% carbon by weight. There is so much carbon present that the hardness cannot be switched off. Hence, cast iron is a brittle metal, which can break like glass. Cast iron cannot be forged without special heat treatment to convert it to malleable iron.

Steel with less than 0.6% carbon content cannot be hardened enough by simple heat-treatment to make useful hardened-steel tools. Hence, in what follows, wrought-iron, low-carbon-steel, and other soft unhardenable iron varieties are referred to indiscriminately as just iron.

== History, prehistory, religion, and mythology ==
=== Mythology ===
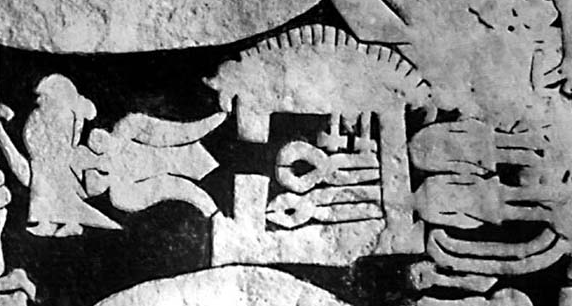
Wayland's smithy in the centre, Níðuð's daughter Böðvildr to the left, and Níðuð's dead sons hidden to the right of the smithy. Between the girl and the smithy, Wayland can be seen in an eagle fetch flying away. From the Ardre image stone VIII on Gotland

In Hindu mythology, Tvastar also known as Vishvakarma is the blacksmith of the devas. The earliest references of Tvastar can be found in the Rigveda.

Hephaestus (Latin: Vulcan) was the blacksmith of the gods in Greek and Roman mythology. A supremely skilled artisan whose forge was a volcano, he constructed most of the weapons of the gods, as well as beautiful assistants for his smithy and a metal fishing-net of astonishing intricacy. He was the god of metalworking, fire, and craftsmen.

In Celtic mythology, the role of Smith is held by eponymous (their names do mean 'smith') characters : Goibhniu (Irish myths of the Tuatha Dé Danann cycle) or Gofannon (Welsh myths/ the Mabinogion). Brigid or Brigit, an Irish goddess, is sometimes described as the patroness of blacksmiths.

In the Nart mythology of the Caucasus the hero known to the Ossetians as Kurdalægon and the Circassians as Tlepsh is a blacksmith and skilled craftsman whose exploits exhibit shamanic features, sometimes bearing comparison to those of the Scandinavian deity Odin. One of his greatest feats is acting as a type of male midwife to the hero Xamyc, who has been made the carrier of the embryo of his son Batraz by his dying wife the water-sprite Lady Isp, who spits it between his shoulder blades, where it forms a womb-like cyst. Kurdalaegon prepares a type of tower or scaffold above a quenching bath for Xamyc, and, when the time is right, lances the cyst to liberate the infant hero Batraz as a newborn babe of white-hot steel, whom Kurdalægon then quenches like a newly forged sword.

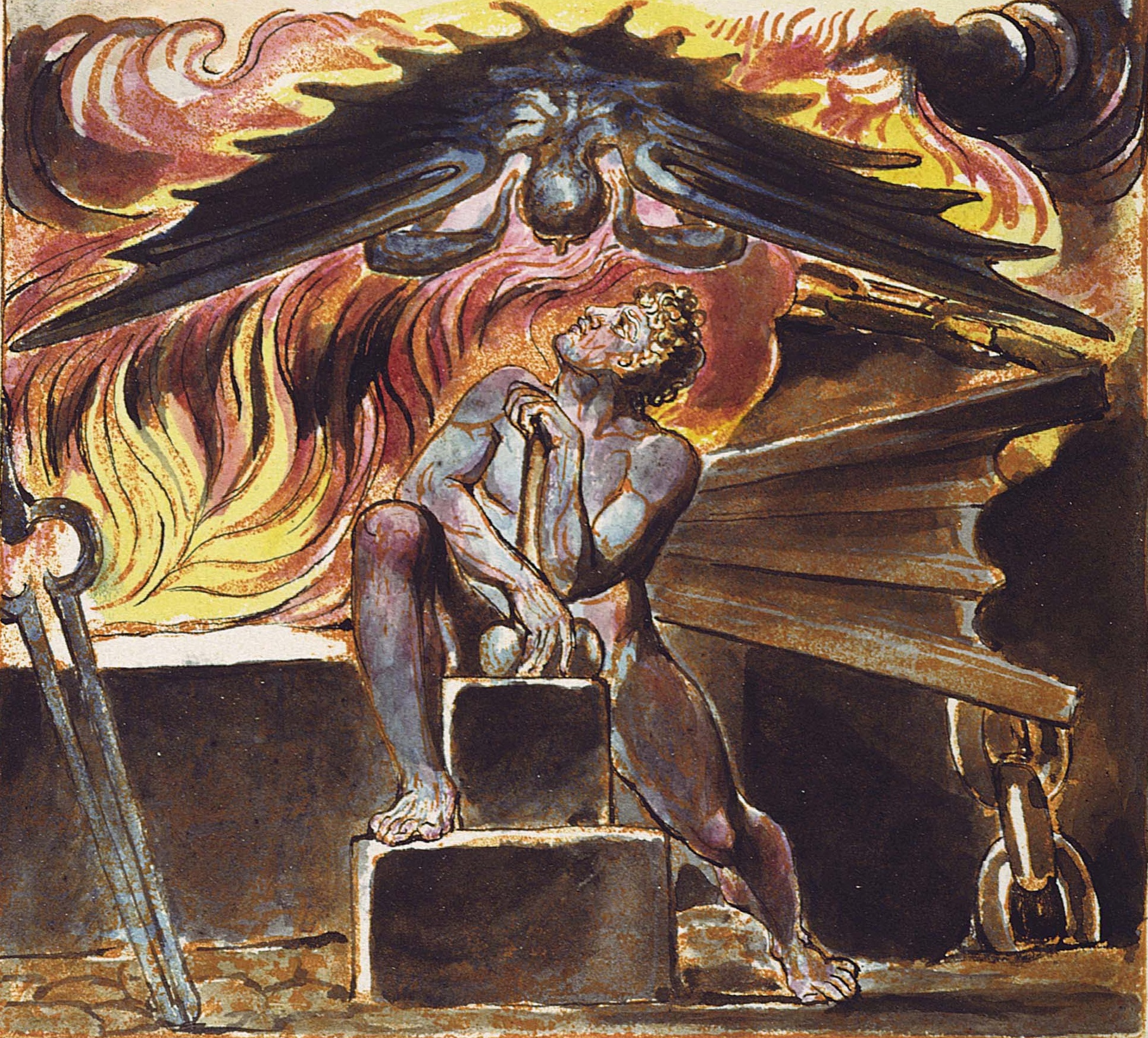
The artist William Blake used the blacksmith as a motif in his own extensive mythology. Here, Los, a protagonist in several of Blake's poems, is tormented at his smithy by the figure Spectre in an illustration Blake's poem Jerusalem. This image comes from Copy E. of that work, printed in 1821 and in the collection of the Yale Center for British Art

The Anglo-Saxon Wayland Smith, known in Old Norse as Völundr, is a heroic blacksmith in Germanic mythology. The Poetic Edda states that he forged beautiful gold rings set with wonderful gems. He was captured by king Níðuðr, who cruelly hamstrung him and imprisoned him on an island. Völundr eventually had his revenge by killing Níðuðr's sons and fashioning goblets from their skulls, jewels from their eyes and a brooch from their teeth. He then raped the king's daughter, after drugging her with strong beer, and escaped, laughing, on wings of his own making, boasting that he had fathered a child upon her.

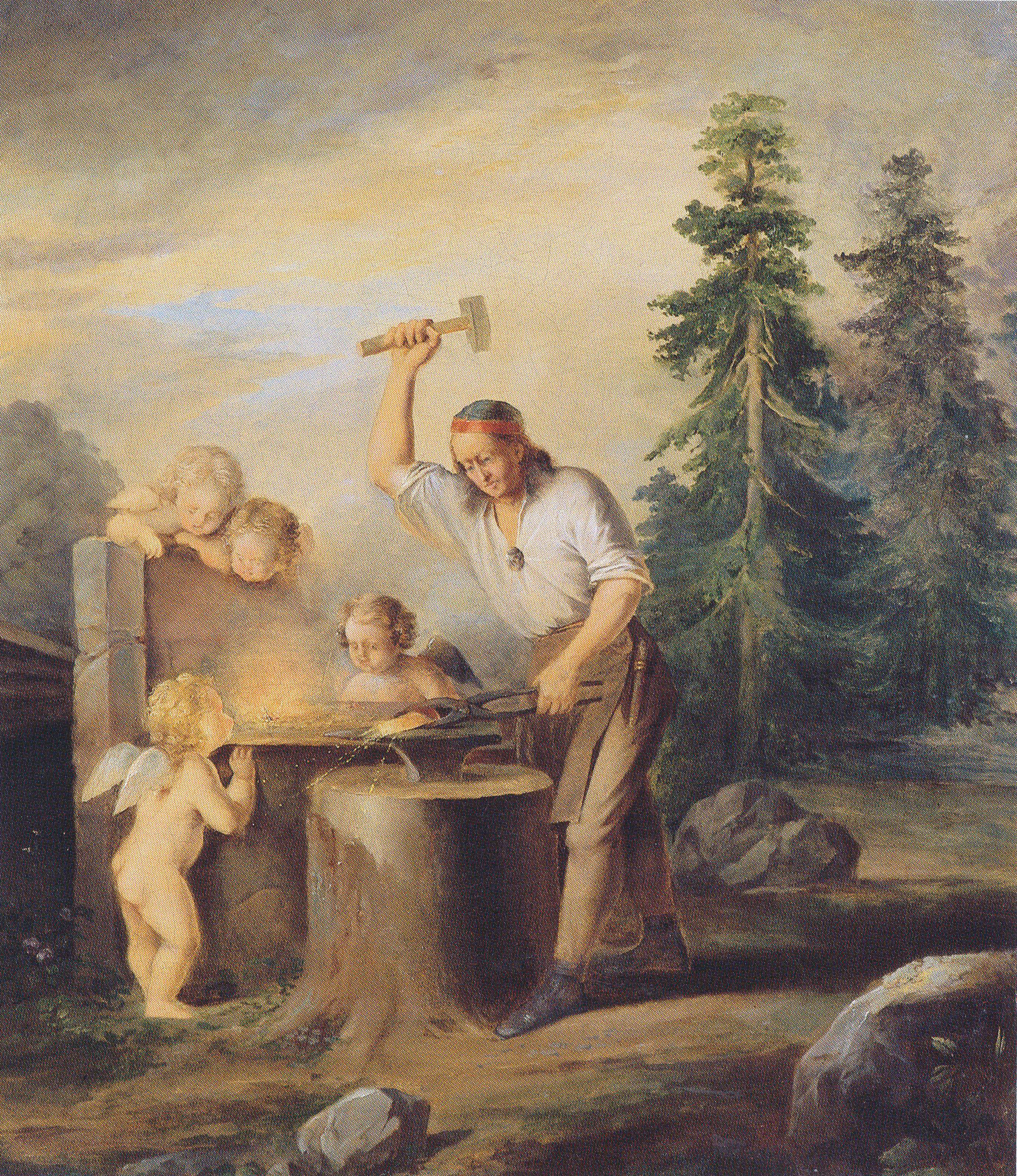
Ilmarinen Forges the Sampo, Berndt Godenhjelm, 19th century

Seppo Ilmarinen, the Eternal Hammerer, blacksmith and inventor in the Kalevala, is an archetypal artificer from Finnish mythology.

Tubal-Cain is mentioned in the book of Genesis of the Torah as the original smith.

Ogun, the god of blacksmiths, warriors, hunters and others who work with iron is one of the pantheon of Oriṣa traditionally worshipped by the Yoruba people of West Africa.

=== Before the Iron Age ===
Gold, silver, and copper all occur in nature in their native states, as reasonably pure metals – humans probably worked these metals first. These metals are all quite malleable, and humans' initial development of hammering techniques was undoubtedly applied to these metals.

During the Chalcolithic era and the Bronze Age, humans in the Mideast learned how to smelt, melt, cast, rivet, and (to a limited extent) forge copper and bronze. Bronze is an alloy of copper and approximately 10% to 20% Tin. Bronze is superior to just copper, by being harder, being more resistant to corrosion, and by having a lower melting point (thereby requiring less fuel to melt and cast). Much of the copper used by the Mediterranean World came from the island of Cyprus. Most of the tin came from the Cornwall region of Great Britain, transported by sea-borne Phoenician and Greek traders.

Copper and bronze cannot be hardened by heat-treatment, they can only be hardened by cold working. To accomplish this, a piece of bronze is lightly hammered for a long period of time. The localized stress-cycling causes work hardening by changing the size and shape of the metal's crystals. The hardened bronze can then be ground to sharpen it to make edged tools.

Clocksmiths as recently as the 19th century used work hardening techniques to harden the teeth of brass gears and ratchets. Tapping on just the teeth produced harder teeth, with superior wear-resistance. By contrast, the rest of the gear was left in a softer and tougher state, more capable of resisting cracking.

Bronze is sufficiently corrosion-resistant that artifacts of bronze may last thousands of years relatively unscathed. Accordingly, museums frequently preserve more examples of Bronze Age metal-work than examples of artifacts from the much younger Iron Age. Buried iron artifacts may completely rust away in less than 100 years. Examples of ancient iron work still extant are very much the exception to the norm.

=== Iron Age ===
Concurrent with the advent of alphabetic characters in the Iron Age, humans became aware of the metal iron. However, in earlier ages, iron's qualities, in contrast to those of bronze, were not generally understood. Iron artifacts, composed of meteoric iron, have the chemical composition containing up to 40% nickel. As this source of this iron is extremely rare and fortuitous, little development of smithing skills peculiar to iron can be assumed to have occurred. That we still possess any such artifacts of meteoric iron may be ascribed to the vagaries of climate, and the increased corrosion-resistance conferred on iron by the presence of nickel.

During the (north) Polar Exploration of the early 20th century, Inughuit, northern Greenlandic Inuit, were found to be making iron knives from two particularly large nickel-iron meteors. One of these meteors was taken to Washington, D.C., where it was remitted to the custody of the Smithsonian Institution.

The Hittites of Anatolia first discovered or developed the smelting of iron ores around 1500 BC. They seem to have maintained a near monopoly on the knowledge of iron production for several hundred years, but when their empire collapsed during the Eastern Mediterranean upheavals around 1200 BC, the knowledge seems to have escaped in all directions.

In the Iliad of Homer (describing the Trojan War and Bronze Age Greek and Trojan warriors), most of the armor and weapons (swords and spears) are stated to have been of bronze. Iron is not unknown, however, as arrowheads are described as iron, and a "ball of iron" is listed as a prize awarded for winning a competition. The events described probably occurred around 1200 BC, but Homer is thought to have composed this epic poem around 700 BC; so exactitude must remain suspect.

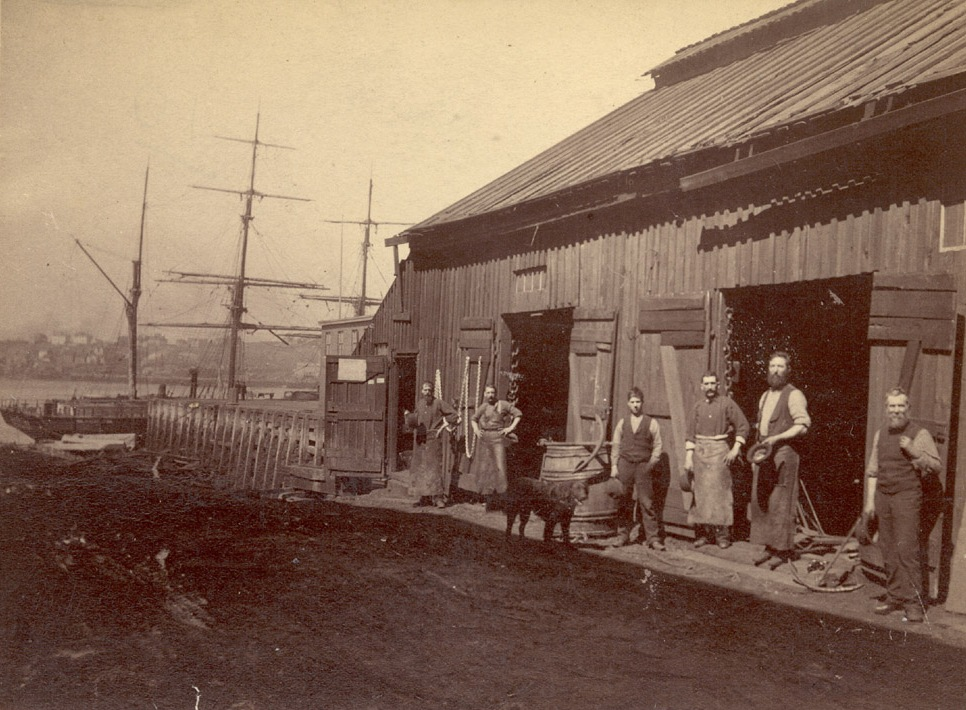
A blacksmith shop in the harbor of Saint John, New Brunswick, Canada in the late 19th century

The historical record during the Late Bronze Age Collapse is very inconsistent. Very few iron artifacts remain from the early Iron Age, due to loss from corrosion and re-use of iron as a valuable commodity. However, all of the basic operations of blacksmithing were in use by the time the Iron Age reached a particular locality. The scarcity of records and artifacts, and the rapidity of the transition from Bronze Age to Iron Age, is a reason to use evidence of bronze smithing to infer about the early development of blacksmithing.

It is uncertain when Iron weapons replaced Bronze weapons because the earliest Iron swords did not significantly improve on the qualities of existing bronze artifacts. Unalloyed iron is soft, does not hold an edge as well as a properly constructed bronze blade and needs more maintenance. Iron ores are more widely available than the necessary materials to create bronze however, which made iron weapons more economical than comparable bronze weapons. Small amounts of steel are often formed during several of the earliest refining practices, and when the properties of this alloy were discovered and exploited, steel edged weapons greatly outclassed bronze.

Iron is different from most other materials (including bronze), in that it does not immediately go from a solid to a liquid at its melting point. H_{2}O is a solid (ice) at −1 C (31 F), and a liquid (water) at +1 C (33 F). Iron, by contrast, is definitely a solid at 800 °F (427 °C), but over the next 1,500 °F (820 °C) it becomes increasingly plastic and more "taffy-like" as its temperature increases. This extreme temperature range of variable solidity is the fundamental material property upon which blacksmithing practice depends.

Another major difference between bronze and iron fabrication techniques is that bronze can be melted. The melting point of iron is much higher than that of bronze. In the western (Europe & the Mideast) tradition, the technology to make fires hot enough to melt iron did not arise until the 16th century, when smelting operations grew large enough to require overly large bellows. These produced blast-furnace temperatures high enough to melt partially refined ores, resulting in cast iron. Thus cast-iron frying pans and cookware did not become possible in Europe until 3000 years after the introduction of iron smelting. China, in a separate developmental tradition, was producing cast iron at least 1000 years before this.

Although iron is quite abundant, good quality steel remained rare and expensive until the industrial developments of Bessemer process et al. in the 1850s. Close examination of blacksmith-made antique tools clearly shows where small pieces of steel were forge-welded into iron to provide the hardened steel cutting edges of tools (notably in axes, adzes, chisels, etc.). The re-use of quality steel is another reason for the lack of artifacts.

The Romans (who ensured that their own weapons were made with good steel) noted (in the 4th century BC) that the Celts of the Po River Valley had iron, but not good steel. The Romans record that during battle, their Celtic opponents could only swing their swords two or three times before having to step on their swords to straighten them.

On the Indian subcontinent, Wootz steel was, and continues to be, produced in small quantities.

In southern Asia and western Africa, blacksmiths form endogenous castes that sometimes speak distinct languages.

=== Medieval period ===
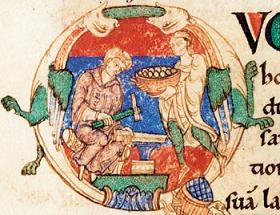
A blacksmith monk, from a medieval French manuscript

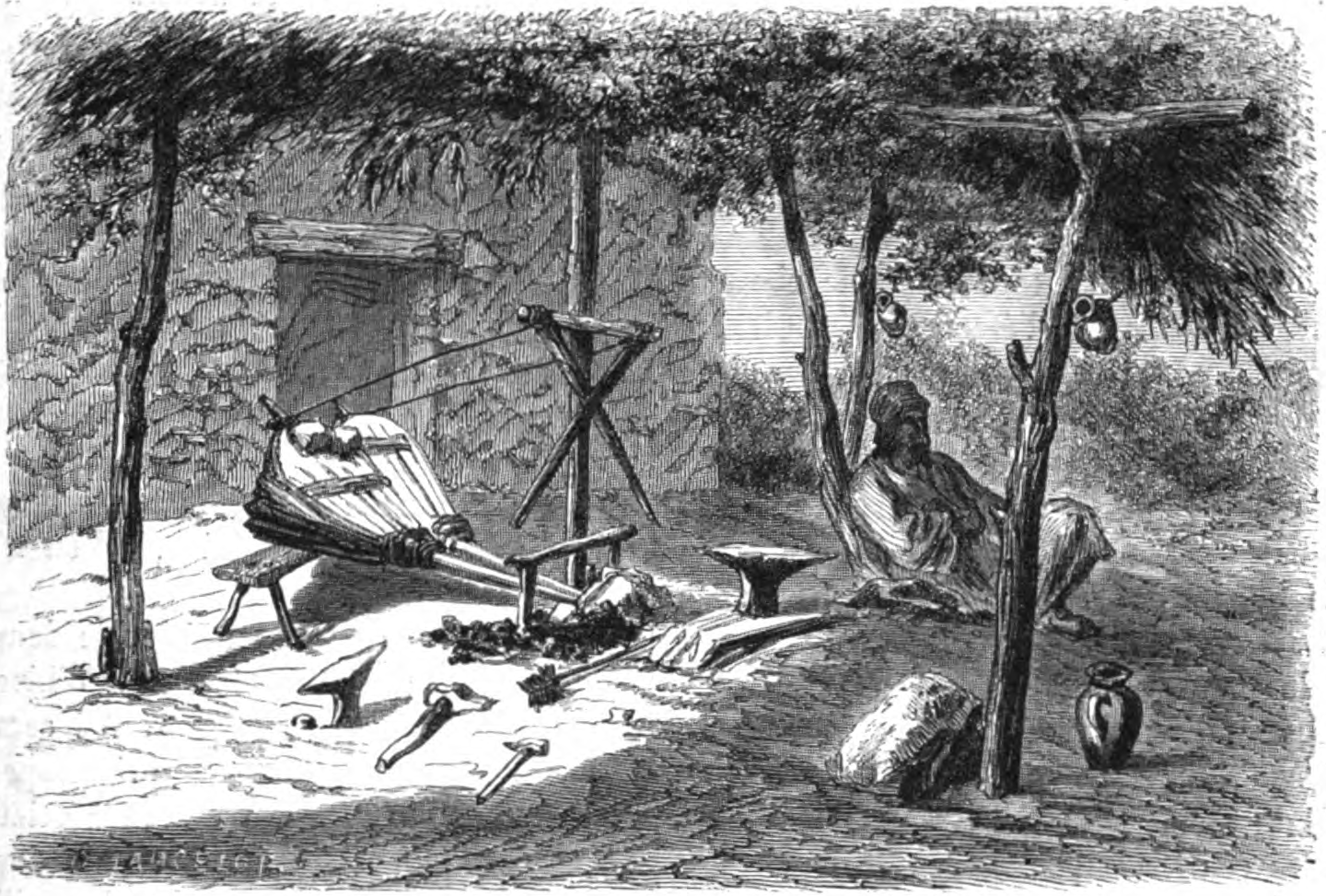
A Roma smith and his forge in Wallachia, by Dieudonné Lancelot, 1860

In the medieval period, blacksmithing was considered part of the set of seven mechanical arts.

Prior to the Industrial Revolution, a "village smithy" was a staple of every town. Factories and mass-production reduced the demand for blacksmith-made tools and hardware.

Blacksmiths typically worked in small shops, often in the center of a village or town. Their shops were typically equipped with a forge, an anvil, and a variety of other tools. The work of a medieval blacksmith was physically demanding and often dangerous. Blacksmiths had to be able to lift and move heavy pieces of metal, and they had to be careful not to burn themselves on the hot forge.

Despite the challenges, blacksmithing was a respected trade in medieval society. Blacksmiths were considered to be skilled artisans, and their work was essential to the functioning of medieval society.

==== Women ====
Whilst the majority of blacksmiths named in Britain in the medieval period were men, some women also worked as smiths. For example, in 1346 Katherine Le Fevre was appointed by Edward III to ‘keep up the king’s forge within the Tower and carry on [its] work … receiving the wages pertaining to the office’. Another example is of Alice la Haubergere (Mail-maker) who owned an armour shop and worked as an armourer in Cheapside. In York in 1403 Agnes Hecche was left her father's mail-making equipment in his will, and took over the family business with her brother. Others included the bell founder Johanna Hill, the cutler Agnes Cotiller and Eustachia l’Armurer.

==== Medieval blacksmithing techniques ====
Medieval blacksmiths used a variety of techniques to create metal objects. One of the most common techniques was forging. Forging is the process of heating metal until it is soft enough to be shaped with a hammer and anvil.

Another common technique was welding. Welding is the process of joining two pieces of metal together by heating them until they melt and then hammering them together.

Blacksmiths also used a variety of other techniques, such as casting, cutting, and filing.

The original fuel for forge fires was charcoal. Coal did not begin to replace charcoal until the forests of first Britain (during the AD 17th century), and then the eastern United States of America (during the 19th century) were largely depleted. Coal can be an inferior fuel for blacksmithing, because much of the world's coal is contaminated with sulfur. Sulfur contamination of iron and steel make them "red short", so that at red heat they become "crumbly" instead of "plastic". Coal sold and purchased for blacksmithing should be largely free of sulfur.

European blacksmiths before and through the medieval era spent a great deal of time heating and hammering iron before forging it into finished articles. Although they were unaware of the chemical basis, they were aware that the quality of the iron was thus improved. From a scientific point of view, the reducing atmosphere of the forge was both removing oxygen (rust), and soaking more carbon into the iron, thereby developing increasingly higher grades of steel as the process was continued.

=== Industrial era ===
During the eighteenth century, agents for the Sheffield cutlery industry scoured the British country-side, offering new carriage springs for old. Springs must be made of hardened steel. At this time, the processes for making steel produced an extremely variable product—quality was not ensured at the initial point of sale. Springs that had survived cracking through hard use over the rough roads of the time, had proven to be of a better quality steel. Much of the fame of Sheffield cutlery (knives, shears, etc.) was due to the extreme lengths the companies took to ensure they used high-grade steel.

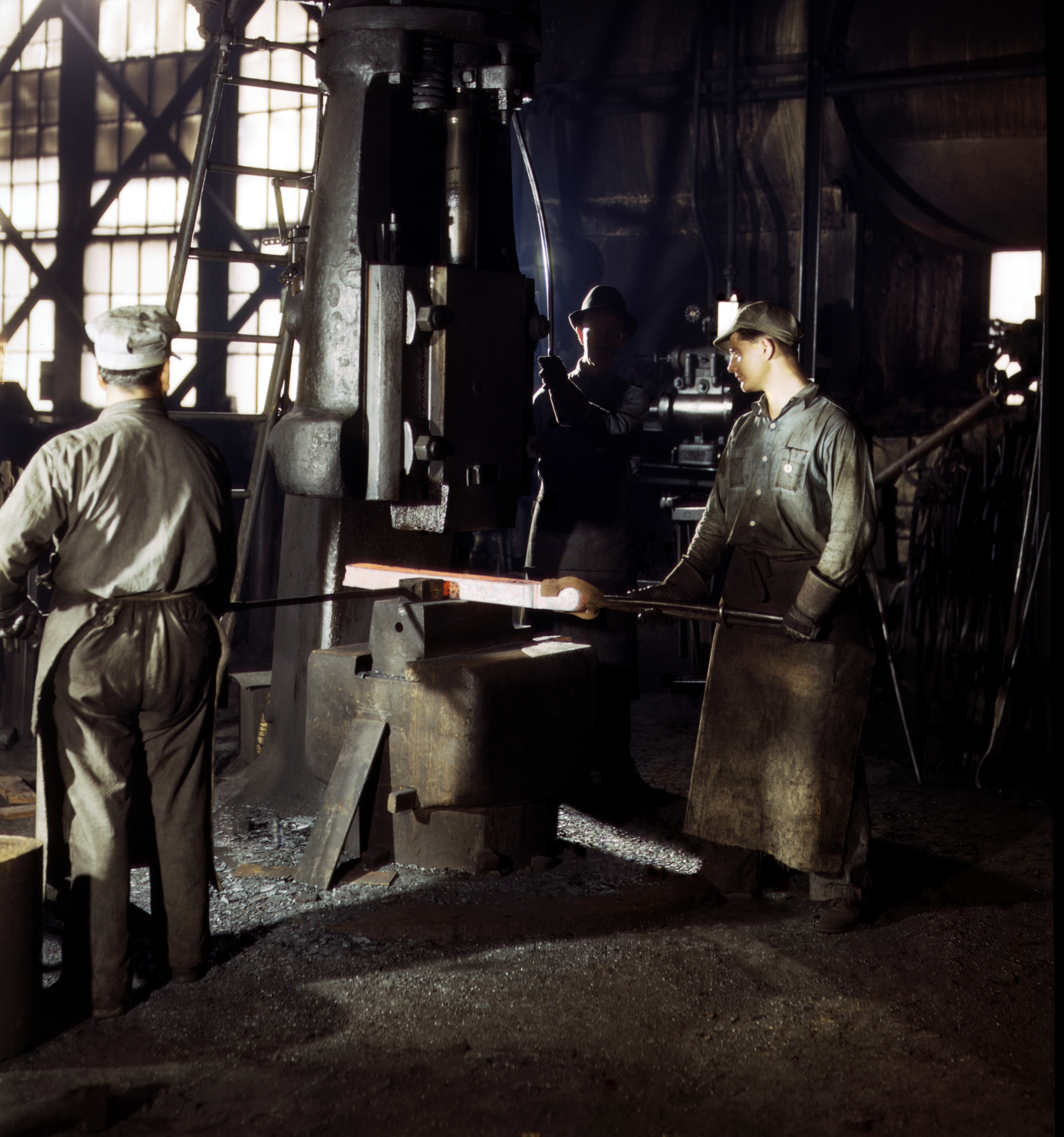
Blacksmiths at the Atchison, Topeka and Santa Fe Railway shops in Topeka, Kansas, 1943

During the first half of the nineteenth century, the US government included in their treaties with many Native American tribes, that the US would employ blacksmiths and strikers at Army forts, with the expressed purpose of providing Native Americans with iron tools and repair services.

During the early to mid-nineteenth century, both European armies as well as both the U.S. Federal and Confederate armies employed blacksmiths to shoe horses and repair equipment such as wagons, horse tack, and artillery equipment. These smiths primarily worked at a traveling forge that when combined with a limber, comprised wagons specifically designed and constructed as blacksmith shops on wheels to carry the essential equipment necessary for their work.

High school blacksmith class, Salt Lake City, Utah, 1915

Lathes, patterned largely on their woodturning counterparts, had been used by some blacksmiths since the middle-ages. During the 1790s Henry Maudslay created the first screw-cutting lathe, a watershed event that signaled the start of blacksmiths being replaced by machinists in factories for the hardware needs of the populace.

Samuel Colt neither invented nor perfected interchangeable parts, but his insistence (and other industrialists at this time) that his firearms be manufactured with this property, was another step towards the obsolescence of metal-working artisans and blacksmiths. (See also Eli Whitney).

As demand for their products declined, many more blacksmiths augmented their incomes by taking in work shoeing horses. A shoer-of-horses was historically known as a farrier in English. With the introduction of automobiles, the number of blacksmiths continued to decrease, many former blacksmiths becoming the initial generation of automobile Mechanics. The nadir of blacksmithing in the United States was reached during the 1960s, when most of the former blacksmiths had left the trade, and few if any new people were entering the trade. By this time, most of the working blacksmiths were those performing farrier work, so the term blacksmith was effectively co-opted by the farrier trade.

==== Neoclassicism era ====
In the final part of the 18th century, forged ironwork continued to decline due to the aforementioned industrial revolution, shapes of the elements in the designs of window grilles and other decorative functional items continued to contradict natural forms, surfaces begin to be covered in paint, cast iron elements are incorporated into the forged designs.

Main features of Neoclassicism ironwork (also referred to as Louis XVI style and Empire style ironwork) include smooth straight bars, decorative geometric elements, double or oval volutes and the usage of elements from Classical antiquity (Meander (art), wreaths etc.).

Typical for this kind of ironwork is that the ironwork is painted white with gold (gilded) elements.

== 20th and 21st centuries ==
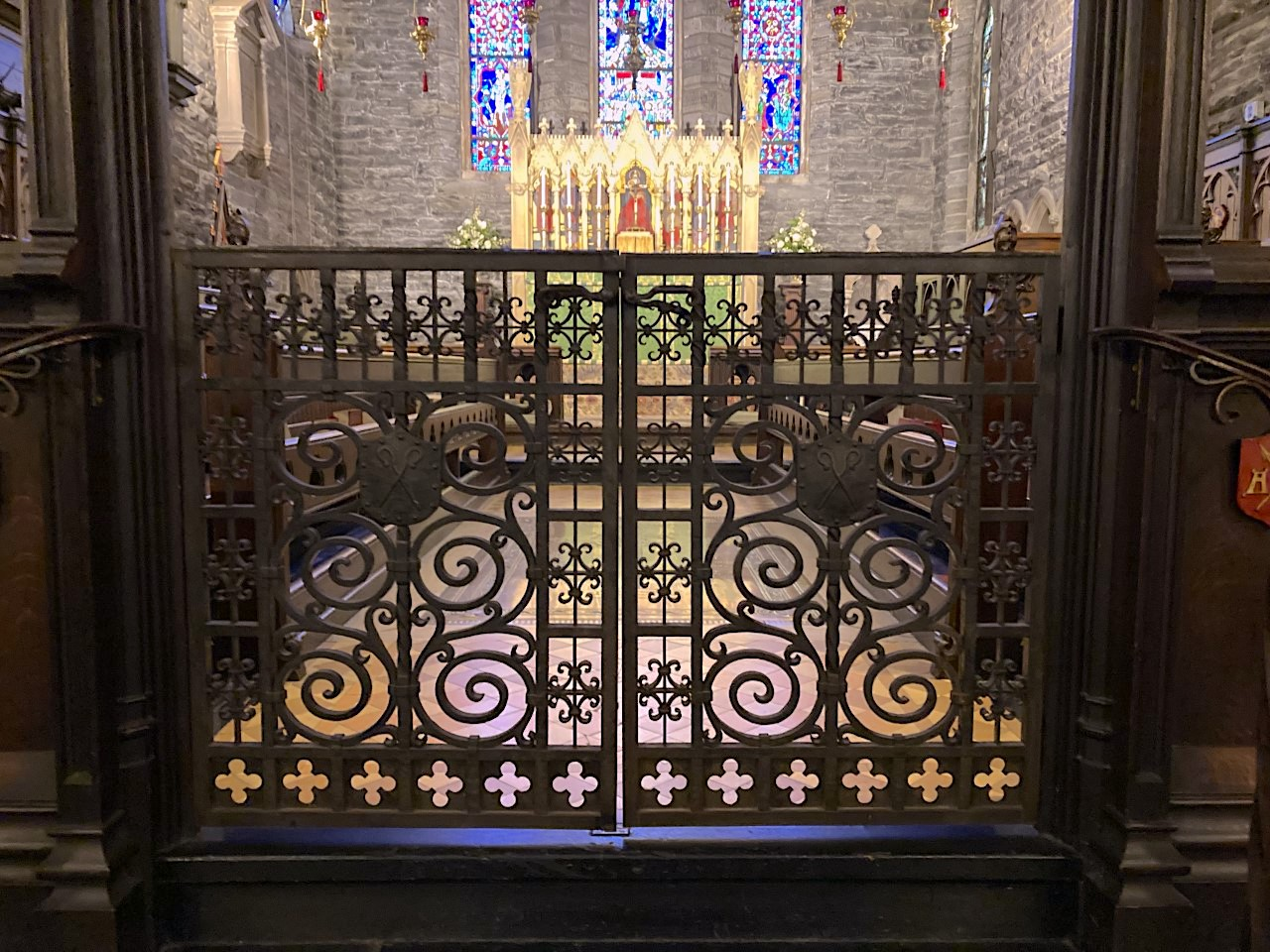
Chancel iron gates designed by master blacksmith Samuel Yellin at Church of the Good Shepherd (Rosemont, Pennsylvania), USA

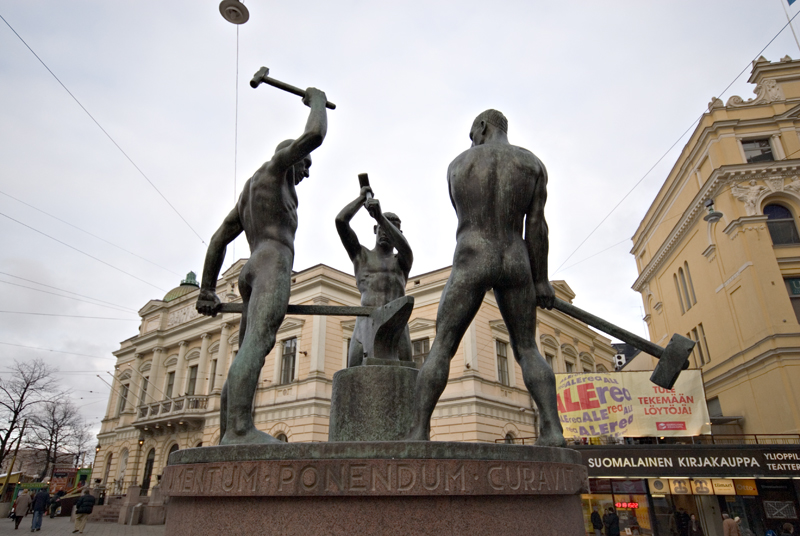
The Three Smiths Statue, situated at the intersection of Aleksanterinkatu and Mannerheimintie in Kluuvi, Helsinki, Finland

During the 20th century various gases (natural gas, acetylene, etc.) have also come to be used as fuels for blacksmithing. While these are fine for blacksmithing iron, special care must be taken when using them to blacksmith steel. Each time a piece of steel is heated, there is a tendency for the carbon content to leave the steel (decarburization). This can leave a piece of steel with an effective layer of unhardenable iron on its surface. In a traditional charcoal or coal forge, the fuel is really just carbon. In a properly regulated charcoal/coal fire, the air in and immediately around the fire should be a reducing atmosphere. In this case, and at elevated temperatures, there is a tendency for vaporized carbon to soak into steel and iron, counteracting or negating the decarburizing tendency. This is similar to the process by which a case of steel is developed on a piece of iron in preparation for case hardening.

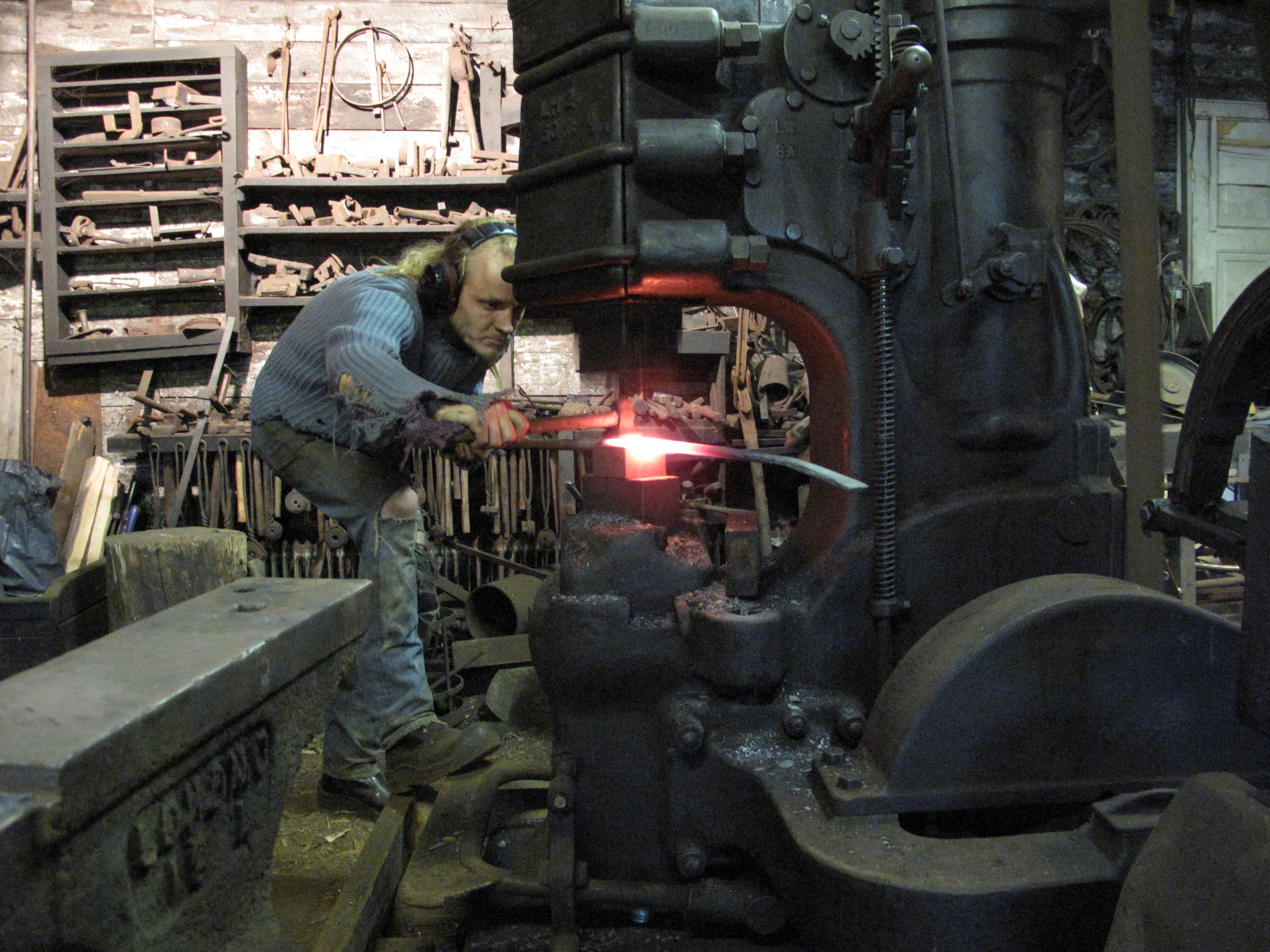
An Artist Blacksmith working with a power hammer in Bodom, Finland, 2011

A renewed interest in blacksmithing occurred as part of the trend in "do-it-yourself" and "self-sufficiency" that occurred during the 1970s. Currently there are many books, organizations and individuals working to help educate the public about blacksmithing, including local groups of smiths who have formed clubs, with some of those smiths demonstrating at historical sites and living history events. Some modern blacksmiths who produce decorative metalwork refer to themselves as artist-blacksmiths. In 1973 the Artists Blacksmiths’ Association of North America was formed with 27 members. By 2013 it had almost 4000 members. Likewise the British Artist Blacksmiths Association was created in 1978, with 30 charter members and had about 600 members in 2013 and publish for members a quarterly magazine.

While developed nations saw a decline and re-awakening of interest in blacksmithing, in many developing nations blacksmiths continued making and repairing iron and steel tools and hardware for people in their local area.

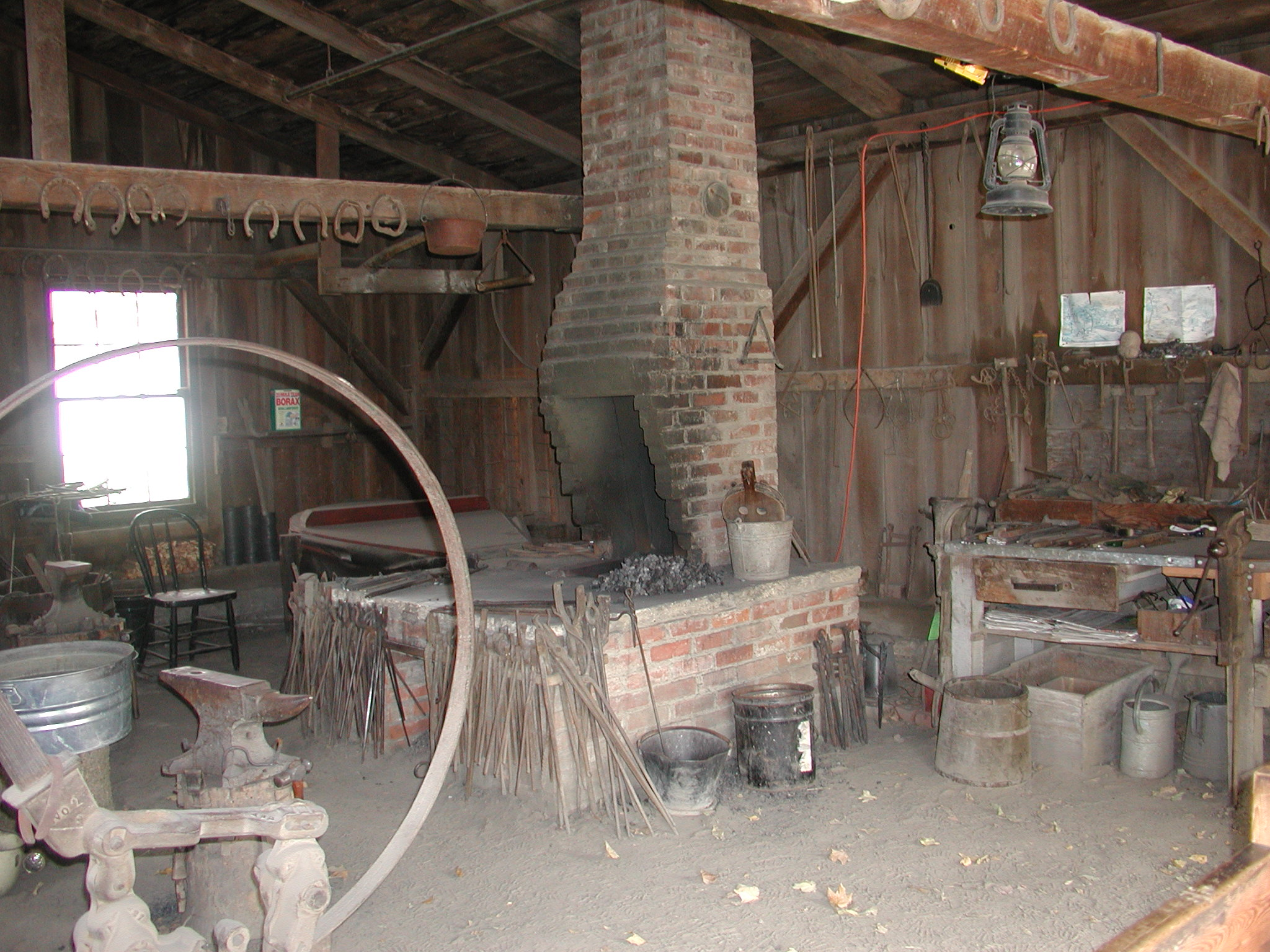
Jesse Hoover blacksmith shop, Herbert Hoover National Historic Site

== Notable blacksmiths ==
=== Mythological and religious ===
- Ptah, Egyptian patron god of craftsmen and architects
- Ame-no-Mahitotsu, Shinto god of metal-working and blacksmiths
- Svarog, Slavic god of the forge, fire, the sun, and creation
- Vishwakarma, Hindu god of blacksmithing
- Goibniu, Irish god of blacksmithing
- Ogun, Yoruba oriṣa of blacksmiths, iron and war
- Hephaestus/Vulcan, god of metalworking and the forge in Greek and Roman mythologies
- Thor, Norse god of storms, metalworking, and the forge
- Tubal-cain, in biblical tradition, the first smith
- Sons of Ivaldi, in Norse mythology three dwarf brothers who make a variety of gifts for the gods
- Mime, brother of Alberich, Wagnerian dwarf and maker of the sword Nothung and the Tarnhelm
- Kāveh, in Persian mythology a blacksmith who launched a national uprising against the evil foreign tyrant Zahāk, after losing two of his children to serpents of Zahāk
- Tlepsh and Kurdalægon, the Circassian and Ossetian formsm respectively, of the blacksmith hero of the Narts, who presides at the birth / quenching of the steel child who grows into the hero Batraz / Pataraz

=== Historical ===
- James Black, creator of original Bowie knife
- John Silvester, a blacksmith at the Tower of London
- Panday Pira, the first Filipino cannon maker
- Gorō Nyūdō Masamune, mediaeval Japanese blacksmith

=== Modern ===
- Elizabeth Brim, noted for feminine imagery of lingerie or shoes in her work, also for the Brim technique of inflating balloons of hot metal with compressed air
- Roland Greefkes, wrought iron work
- Paul Zimmermann, contemporary forge work

== See also ==
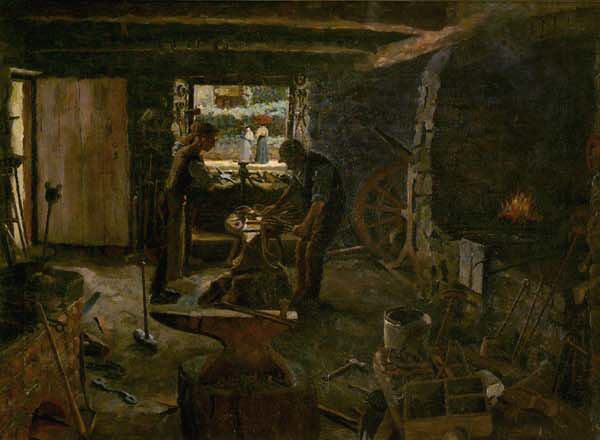
Painting by Joseph Morewood Staniforth, 1892

- Blacksmiths festival, an annual festival that takes place in Ivano-Frankivsk
- Blacksmith Scene (also, known as Blacksmith Scene #1 and Blacksmithing Scene)
- Bladesmith
- Coppersmith
- Goldsmith
- Hefaiston, one of the most important annual meetings of artist blacksmiths in the world (Czech Republic)
- Ironmongery
- Makera Assada
- Metallurgy
- National School of Blacksmithing (United Kingdom)
- Silversmith
- St Clement's Day
- Tinsmith
- Whitesmith
- Worshipful Company of Blacksmiths
