= Brims =

Brims may refer to:

== People ==
- Harriett Brims (1864–1939), Australian pioneer photographer
- Robin Brims (born 1951), British Army officer

== Places ==
- Brims, Caithness, the location of Brims Castle, Scotland
- Brims, Orkney, Scotland
- Brims or Brniště, Czech Republic

== Other uses ==
- Brim (hat), projection of stiff material from the bottom of a hat's crown
- Bream or brim, several species of freshwater and marine

== See also ==
- Brim (disambiguation)
