= Roland Greefkes =

Dutch-American blacksmith (1941–2021)

- Born: Roland Cornelis Greefkes; May 27, 1941; The Hague, Netherlands
- Died: August 17, 2021 (aged 80); Cooperstown, New York, U.S.
- Education: University of Toronto (BS)
- Occupation: Blacksmith
- Spouse: Charlotte Walker (died 2021)

Roland Cornelis Greefkes (May 27, 1941 – August 17, 2021) was a Dutch-American master iron smith.

== Biography ==
Born in The Hague, Netherlands, he was the son of Marie Johanna Veltman Greefkes and Cornelis Greefkes, the foremost art smith in the Netherlands after World War II. He earned a degree in chemical engineering from the University of Toronto in 1968, and later spent several years traveling in the Middle East and India before returning to the Netherlands to work with his father. Upon emigrating to the United States in 1977, he worked for several years in Baltimore, then established Aesthetica, his smithy in Gilbertsville, New York, bearing the same name as his late father's smithy in The Hague.

Greefkes was married to Charlotte Walker, an author and English professor, until her death on January 1, 2021. Greefkes died at a hospital in Cooperstown, New York on August 17, 2021, of complications from a fall.

== Works ==
Paradise Gate by Roland C. Greefkes for the garden of Tasmanian writer Sara Douglass

His wrought iron work is characterized by strong representations of nature, freely interpreted in his own style, yet rooted in his father's Art Deco influence. To quote an article by Lee Fleming in Garden Design Magazine,

"Although schooled in the design traditions of the past, Greefkes finds inspiration in the evanescent drama of the natural world that surrounds his forge. ... His designs are dynamic; the natural world they mirror is active, evolving, and often filled with humorous visual anecdotes." (September/October, 1993)

Some of his major works included a driveway gate for Yoko Ono, a firescreen for Bette Midler, firescreens for Blythe Danner and Bruce Paltrow, and a table for Eagles guitarist Don Felder. His "Paradise Gate", an intricate garden gate commissioned by Australian fantasy writer Sara Douglass, is installed in her garden in Tasmania. His liturgical wrought iron pieces are in several churches up and down the East Coast of the United States.
