= Paul Zimmermann (blacksmith) =

German blacksmith (born 1939)

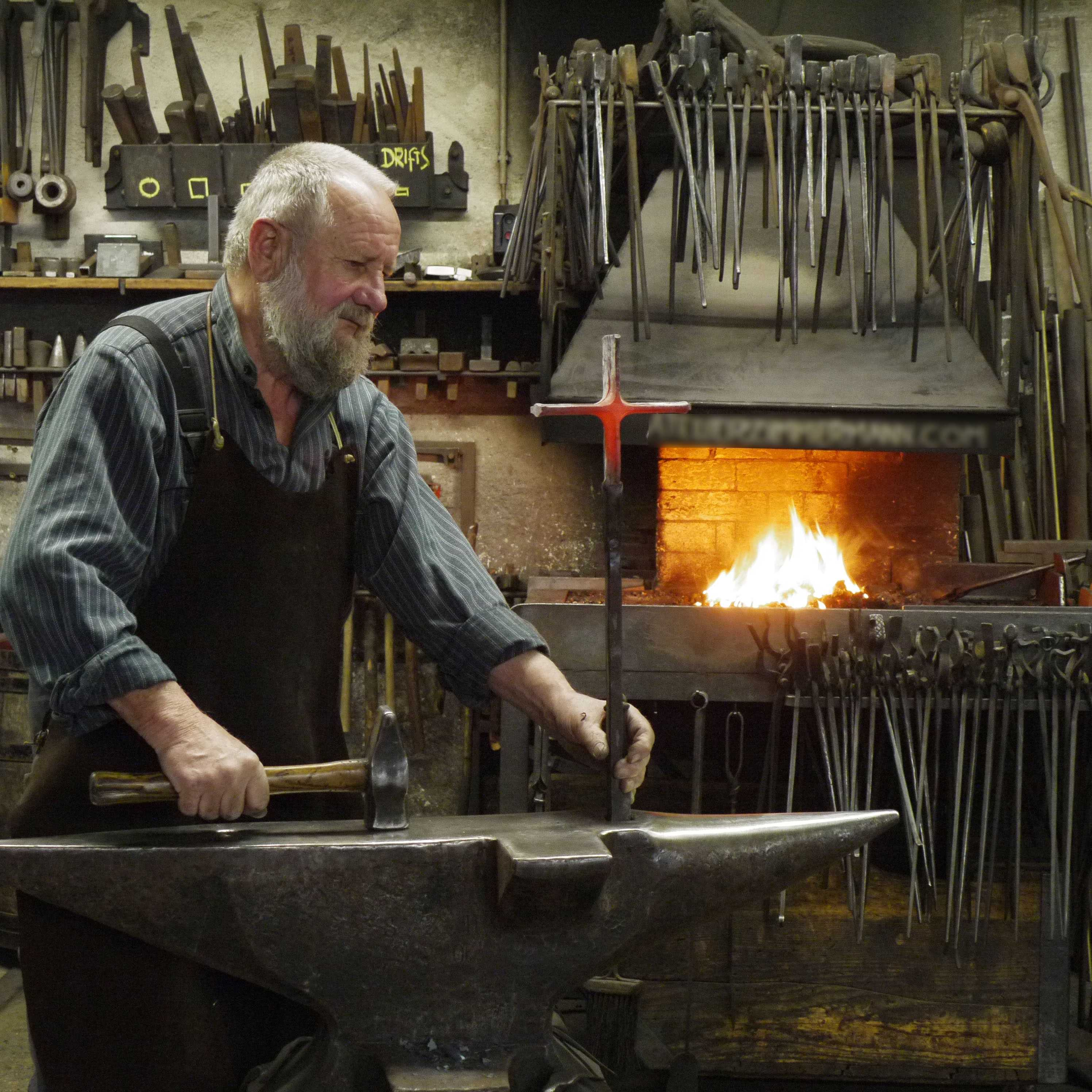
Paul Zimmermann

Paul Zimmermann A.W.C.B. (born 1939) is a German blacksmith who created contemporary forge work. Zimmermann is considered one of the first German blacksmiths to move towards innovative and contemporary forms in the trade. Forms and shapes which he developed are now part of blacksmithing design education in Germany. Zimmerman is the first non-British blacksmith to be awarded the title of Associate of the Worshipful Company of Blacksmiths (A.W.C.B.).

== Early life and career ==
Paul Zimmermann was born in Pliezhausen, Germany in 1939, his parents being farmers during the beginning of World War II. Zimmermann started his traditional apprenticeship in 1953–1956 at an early age of 14. After his apprenticeship he won an award for gifted students and spent time in an intermediate study, partly abroad in Switzerland. In 1962 he qualified as a master craftsman after a year at Luisenschule, Munich. After 1962 Zimmermann taught in vocation institute in Munich. After 1963 Paul Zimmermann set up his own workshop, known as the Atelier Zimmermann in Pliezhausen. Throughout his active work time he demonstrated and lectured at several international blacksmith meetings. Zimmermann won several awards nationally and internationally. His work was displayed on Exhibitions in Germany, England, Finland, France, Italy, Switzerland, Spain, Slovenia, Russia, USA, Canada. Permanently shown work of Paul Zimmermann is in the Victoria and Albert Museum in London, Würth Museum Künzelsau, Germany and the National Ornamental Metal Museum in Memphis.

== Works ==
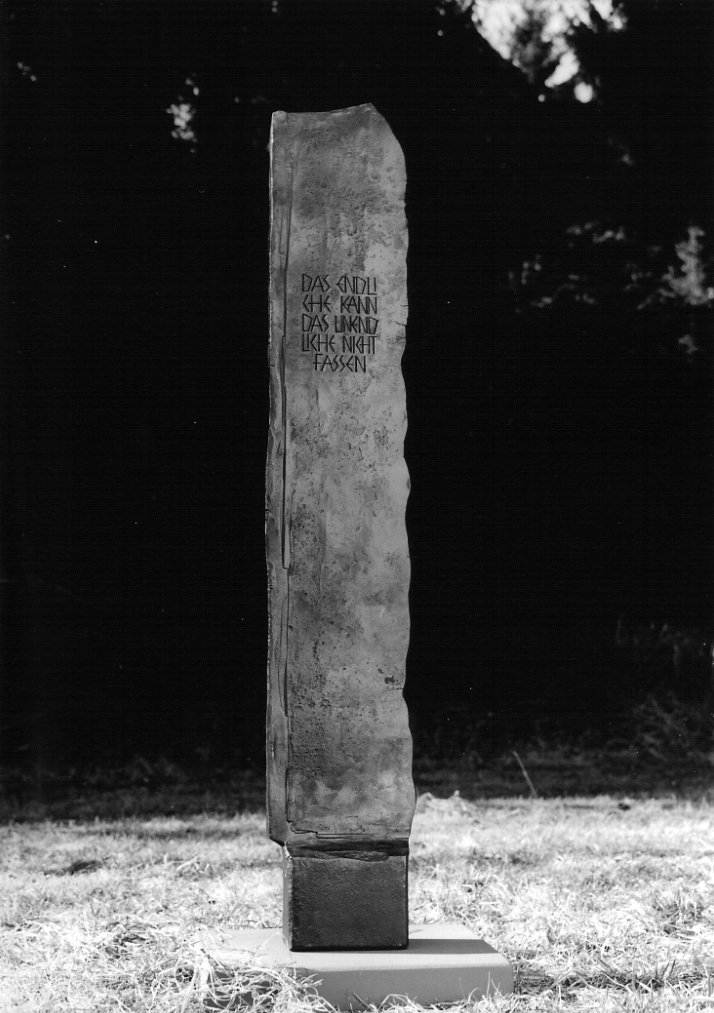
Grave marker made by Paul Zimmermann

Towards the beginning of his career, Paul Zimmermann focused on architectural blacksmithing. He pushed the idea of contemporary design in this traditional craft forward as an essential need for this craft to survive. He expressed his design philosophy often as "Shape is limitation – design is disclosure". Today he is mostly recognized for his sculptural grave markers, done by commission. Some of his grave markers are displayed in the first sepulchral Museum in Kassel, Germany. Zimmermann has often said that "Memorial tablets are the last external sign we can leave to a person close to us – signs that permit remembrance and commune."

- signs that have a very personal reference to the deceased
- signs of thankfulness and reverence
- signs of ephemerality, which reminds us of present
- signs of silence, appeasement, longing, and farewell
- signs, which are credible and suitable for the surroundings."

He continues to work after his retirement. Many apprentices have been working with him studying his philosophy and skills.

Collectors of Paul Zimmermanns work were:

- Helmut Kohl, ex-Chancellor of Germany
- Curd Jürgens, actor

== Recognition and awards ==
- 1962 Scholarship Foundation of gifted Students
- 1974 Golden Decorations of the Crafts Council Reutlingen
- 1982 State Award Arts and Crafts Council of the State Baden Württemberg
- 1989 Certificate of Merit, London
- 1990 Commerce Medal of the state of Baden-Württemberg, Germany
- 1994 Honorable plate metal Association Germany
- 1995 Golden decoration HMf, Baden Württemberg
- 1995 "Karl Reuss Prize" Baden Württemberg
- 1995 Golden Trouser Button, ITCMD London
- 2002 Hans Model Prize
