= Brimmer =

Brimmer is a surname. Notable people with the surname include:

- Andrew Brimmer (1926–2012), economist, academic, and business leader
- Clarence Addison Brimmer Jr. (1922–2014), United States federal judge
- David Brimmer, American voice actor and fight choreographer
- Esther Brimmer, U.S. Assistant Secretary of State for International Organizations
- Gabriela Brimmer (1947–2000), Mexican writer and activist for persons with disabilities
- Jake Brimmer (born 1998), Australian footballer
- Martin Brimmer, American politician and the ninth mayor of Boston, Massachusetts from 1843 to 1844
- Philip A. Brimmer (born 1959), United States federal judge

== See also ==
- Brimer, surname
- "The Broad Black Brimmer", Irish Republican folk song written by Noel Nagle of the Wolfe Tones
