= Spectre (Blake) =

Motif in William Blake's art

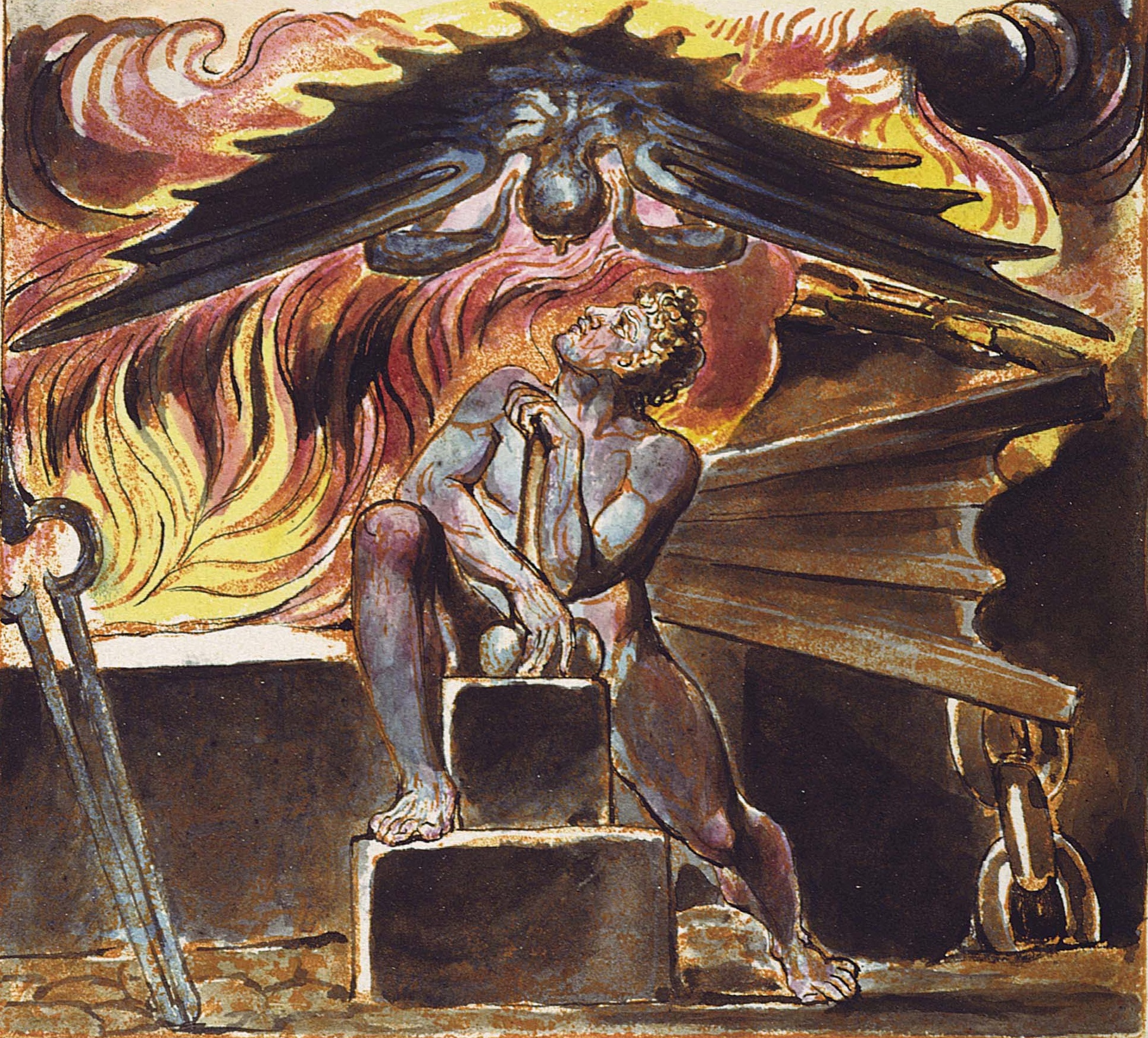
Los's Spectre torments him at his smithy in Blake's poem Jerusalem. This image comes from Copy E. of the work, printed in 1821 and in the collection of the Yale Center for British Art

The Spectre is one aspect of the fourfold nature of the human psyche along with Humanity, Emanation and Shadow that William Blake used to explore his spiritual mythology throughout his poetry and art. As one of Blake's elements of the psyche, Spectre takes on symbolic meaning when referred to throughout his poems. According to professor Joseph Hogan, "Spectre functions to define individuals from others [...] When it is separated [from Emanation], it is reason, trying to define everything in terms of unchanging essences." Thus, according to Samuel Foster Damon, Spectre epitomizes "Reason separated from humanity" and "Self-centered selfhood" or, as Alexander S. Gourlay puts it, Spectre is "characterized by self-defensive rationalization".

Spectre appears in several of Blake's works, including Jerusalem, Milton: a poem and The Four Zoas. Because of its widespread presence in Blake's more mythological works, scholars have reflected on Spectre through multiple critical approaches including Jungian archetypal analysis, as a means of mapping Blake's mythology within intellectual history and within his own biographical experience.

== In Blake's works ==
The mythological character of Spectre is first introduced in Blake's prophetic book Jerusalem:

I see the Four-fold Man, The Humanity in deadly sleep
And its fallen Emanation, the Spectre and its cruel Shadow.

Elsewhere in Jerusalem, Blake defines it this way: "The Spectre is the Reasoning Power in Man, and when separated from Imagination and closing itself as in steel in a Ratio of Things of Memory, It thence frames Laws and Moralities [...]." The Spectre also appears in his published works Milton and The Four Zoas.

In his unpublished hand written workbook, known as the Rossetti Manuscript, he also drafted a poem that began "My Spectre around me night and day / Like a wild beast guards my way." (Note: For a transcription of the poem see it on Wikisource)

== Scholarly approach ==
Historicist critics sometime look for direct inspirations for Blake's mythological ideas, such as Spectre, in his life experiences. In his 1966 article titled "Cowper as Blake's Spectre", Morton Paley argues that William Blake was thinking of the poet William Cowper, his philosophy and madness when creating the character of Spectre. In his argument, he discusses Blake's admiration and connections to Cowper both intellectually and socially as helping Blake create the archetype which became Spectre within the larger Blake mythology .

Some critics have used Blake's mythology to help map elements of his mythology within a larger intellectual history. For example, in his book Blake, Kierkegaard, and the Spectre of Dialectic, Lorraine Clark argues that Spectre and its relationship to Los signals a change in Blake's approach to history and philosophy. He says that Blake in his focus on "the Los and Spectre in The Four Zoas, Milton and Jerusalem, Blake turns from a Hegelian "both-and" dialectic of Orc and Urizen in his earlier works to something very Kierkegaardian "either/or".

In general, Blake's mythology lends itself to psychoanalytic criticism, because of its clear archetypes. According to scholar Mark Ryan, the acclaimed literary critic Northrop Frye often aligned Spectre with persona in Jung's archetypes. On the other hand, Ryan says that many other critiques using archetypal approaches "tend to automatically relate the "Shadow" and the "Spectre," as pertaining to the concept of the dark side of the psyche, without considering the possibility that each character's shadow is, by implication, open to different modes of interpretation."
