= Elizabeth Brim =

American blacksmith

Elizabeth Brim is a blacksmith as well as an instructor at the Penland School of Crafts in Penland, North Carolina. She is best known for feminine imagery in her ironwork.

Her works have been showcased in the United States, Canada, and Germany.

== Background ==
Brim grew up in Columbus, Georgia, and received a Masters of Fine Arts at the University of Georgia in printmaking. After graduating she took an intensive eight-week summer course at Penland School of Crafts in ceramics, and immediately thereafter became a ceramics professor at Columbus College (now Columbus State University). She soon became interested in metals and took a two-week course at Penland, and later an eight-week jewelry course with Marvin Jenson. She continued to work with non-ferrous metals until she entered the forge to fix some iron tools; she was immediately interested and was encouraged to try blacksmithing by instructor Doug Wilson. Despite initially struggling, she was hooked on blacksmithing from that moment on.

== Work ==
"I grew up in a strong female dominated society. My mother and grandmother made frilly dresses for my sister and me and told us fairy tales. The things I make are all about being female and the expectations of women of my generation. I'm just playing dress-up, making a little fun of myself and having a really good time." (Elizabeth Brim Brim's mother did not think blacksmithing was a very ladylike thing to do, so Brim began wearing pearls while working as a kind of joke and it has now become her "signature".

As she moved from basic tool-making into more conceptual and personal pieces, Brim found her niche making feminine objects out of steel. She first made a pair of iron high-heeled shoes based on the fairy tale "Twelve Dancing Princesses" that won first prize at the 1988 ABANA (Artist Blacksmith's Association of North America) Southeastern Regional Conference in Madison, Georgia. She then continued on to make objects like aprons, handbags, pillows, tiaras and high heels that gained recognition for their uniquely juxtaposed feminine imagery in the field of blacksmithing.
