= Brniště =

- Municipality
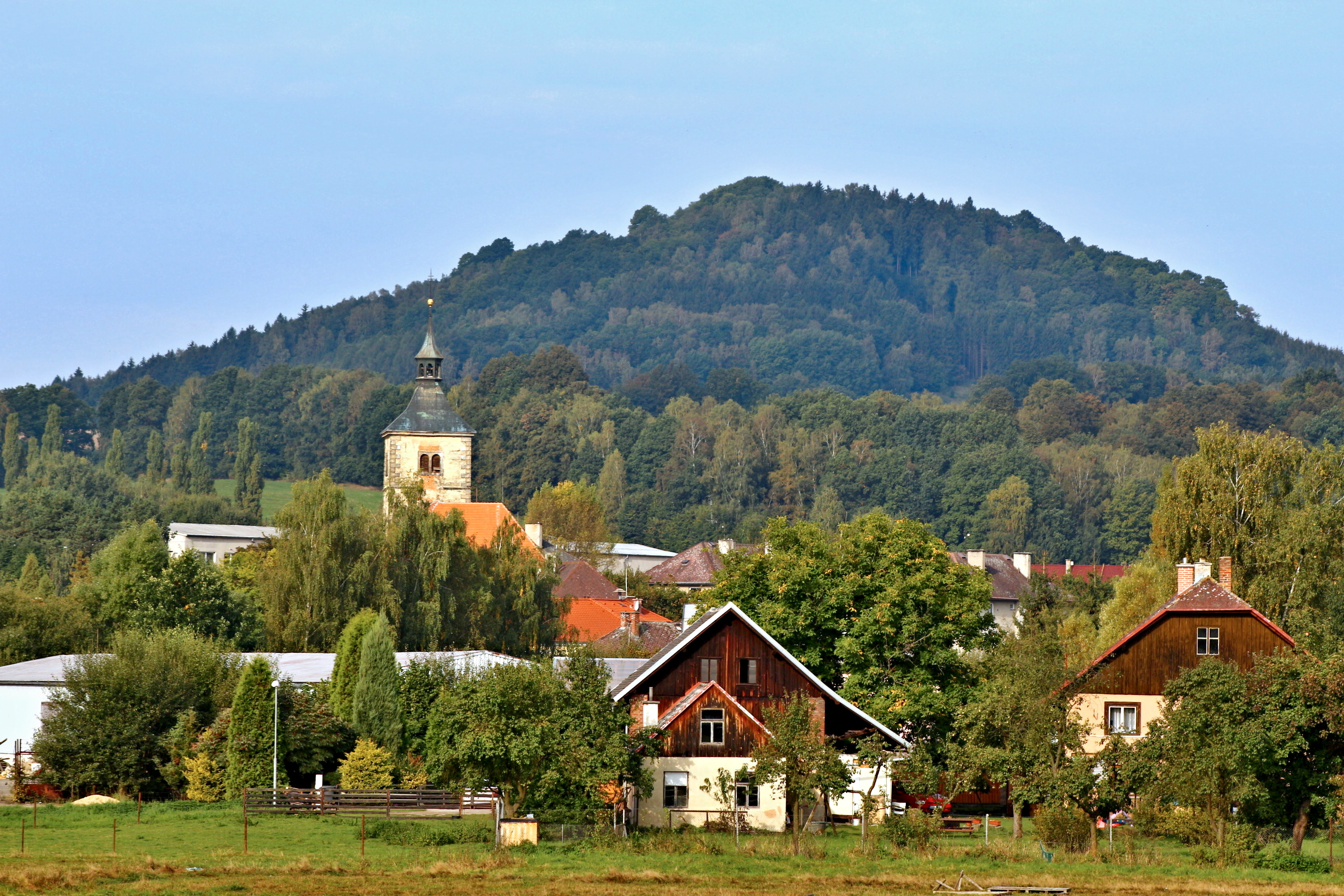
- Brniště seen from the east

- Flag Coat of arms

- Location in the Czech Republic
- Coordinates: 50°43′45″N 14°42′13″E
- Country: Czech Republic
- Region: Liberec
- District: Česká Lípa
- First mentioned: 1352

Area
  - Total: 26.72 km^{2} (10.32 sq mi)
- Elevation: 290 m (950 ft)

Population (2026-01-01)
  - Total: 1,323
  - Density: 49.51/km^{2} (128.2/sq mi)
- Time zone: UTC+1 (CET)
  - Summer (DST): UTC+2 (CEST)
- Postal code: 471 29
- Website: brniste.cz

Brniště (German: Brims) is a municipality and village in Česká Lípa District in the Liberec Region of the Czech Republic. It has about 1,300 inhabitants.

== Administrative division ==
Brniště consists of six municipal parts (in brackets population according to the 2021 census):

- Brniště (471)
- Hlemýždí (207)
- Jáchymov (108)
- Luhov (111)
- Nový Luhov (58)
- Velký Grunov (370)

== Demographics ==
Historical population
Year	Pop.	±%
1869	2,218	—
1880	2,224	+0.3%
1890	2,052	−7.7%
1900	1,980	−3.5%
1910	1,866	−5.8%
1921	2,051	+9.9%
1930	2,132	+3.9%
1950	1,305	−38.8%
1961	1,207	−7.5%
1970	1,227	+1.7%
1980	1,272	+3.7%
1991	1,248	−1.9%
2001	1,332	+6.7%
2011	1,350	+1.4%
2021	1,325	−1.9%
Source: Censuses
