= Brimer =

Brimer is a surname. Notable people with the surname include:

- Bar Brimer (born 1997), Israeli actor and model
- Kim Brimer (born 1945), Republican member of the Texas Senate
- Michael Brimer (1933–2023), South African-Australian composer, pianist and organist

== See also ==
- Brimer Township, Barnes County, North Dakota, a civil township
- Brimmer, surname
