= Poetical Sketches =

Collection of poetry by William Blake

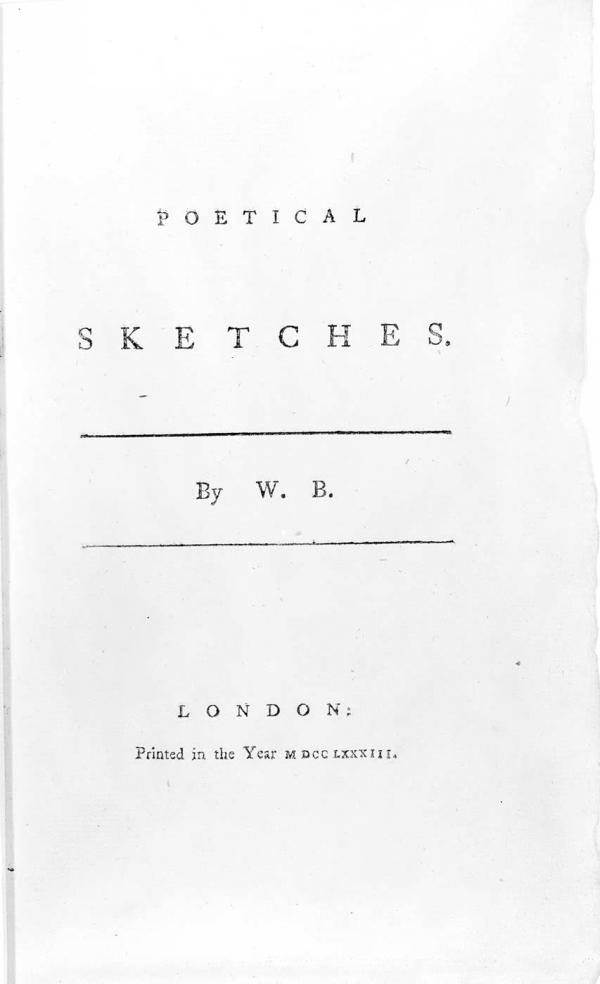
Title page of Poetical Sketches

Poetical Sketches is the first collection of poetry and prose by William Blake, written between 1769 and 1777. Forty copies were printed in 1783 with the help of Blake's friends, the artist John Flaxman and the Reverend Anthony Stephen Mathew, at the request of his wife Harriet Mathew. The book was never published for the public, with copies instead given as gifts to friends of the author and other interested parties. Of the forty copies, fourteen were accounted for at the time of Geoffrey Keynes' census in 1921. A further eight copies had been discovered by the time of Keynes' The Complete Writings of William Blake in 1957. In March 2011, a previously unrecorded copy was sold at auction in London for £72,000.

== Publication ==
The original 1783 copies were seventy-two pages in length, printed in octavo by John Flaxman's aunt, who owned a small print shop in the Strand, and paid for by Anthony Stephen Mathew and his wife Harriet, dilettantes to whom Blake had been introduced by Flaxman in early 1783. Each individual copy was hand-stitched, with a grey back and a blue cover, reading "POETICAL SKETCHES by W.B." It was printed without a table of contents and many pages were without half titles. Of the twenty-two extant copies, eleven contain corrections in Blake's handwriting. Poetical Sketches is one of only two works by Blake to be printed conventionally with typesetting; the only other extant work is The French Revolution in 1791, which was to be published by Joseph Johnson. However, it never got beyond the proof copy and was thus not actually published.

Even given the modest standards by which the book was published, it was something of a failure. Alexander Gilchrist noted that the publication contained several obvious misreadings and numerous errors in punctuation, suggesting that it was printed with little care and was not proofread by Blake (thus the numerous handwritten corrections in printed copies). Gilchrist also notes that it was never mentioned in the Monthly Review, even in the magazine's index of "Books noticed", which listed every book published in London each month, signifying that the publication of the book had gone virtually unnoticed. Nevertheless, Blake himself was proud enough of the volume that he was still giving copies to friends as late as 1808, and when he died, several unstitched copies were found amongst his belongings.

After the initial 1783 publication, Poetical Sketches as a volume remained unpublished until R. H. Shepherd's edition in 1868. However, prior to that, several of the individual poems had been published in journals and anthologised by Blake's early biographers and editors. For example, Benjamin Heath Malkin included 'Song: "How sweet I roam'd from field to field"' and 'Song: "I love the jocund dance"' in A Father's Memoirs of his Child (1806), Allan Cunningham published 'Gwin, King of Norway' and 'To the Muses' in Lives of the most eminent British Painters, Sculptors, and Architects (1830), and Alexander Gilchrist included 'Song: "When early morn walks forth in sober grey"' in his Life of William Blake (1863). Gilchrist, however, did not reproduce Blake's text verbatim, instead incorporating several of his own emendations. Many subsequent editors of Blake included extracts in their collections of his poetry, such as Dante Gabriel Rossetti, A. C. Swinburne, W. B. Yeats and E. J. Ellis, also introduced their own emendations. Due to the extreme rarity of the original publication, these emendations often went unnoticed, thus giving rise to a succession of variant readings on the original content. Subsequent versions repeated or added to these changes, despite what later commentators described as obvious misreadings. However, in 1905, John Sampson produced the first scholarly edition of Blake's work, in which he returned to the original texts, also taking into account Blake's own handwritten corrections. As such, most modern editors tend to follow Sampson's example and use the original 1783 publication as their control text.

== Influences and importance ==
Blake's literary influences in Poetical Sketches include, amongst others, Elizabethan poetry, Shakespearean drama, John Milton, Ben Jonson, Thomas Fletcher, Thomas Gray, William Collins, Thomas Chatterton, Edmund Spenser, James Thomson's The Seasons (1726–1730), Horace Walpole's The Castle of Otranto (1764), James Macpherson's Ossian (1761–1765) and Thomas Percy's Reliques of Ancient English Poetry (1765). Blake shows especial antipathy towards the closed couplet of Augustan poetry.

Although scholars are generally in agreement that Poetical Sketches is far from Blake's best work, it does occupy an important position in Blakean studies, coming as it does at the very outset of his career. In 1947, for example, Northrop Frye declared in Fearful Symmetry that although Poetical Sketches is not regarded as a great piece of work, "it is of the highest importance to us, partly because it shows Blake's symbolic language in an emergent and transitional form, and partly because it confirms that Blake is organically part of his literary age."

Writing in 1965, S. Foster Damon concurs with Frye's opinion. In the entry for Poetical Sketches in Damon's Blake Dictionary, he refers to Sketches as "a book of the revolutionary period, a time of seeking for non-neoclassical inspiration, a preparation for the Romantic period [...] For all the derivative material, the book is a work of genius in its daring figures, its metrical experiments, its musical tone." Damon also writes, "Historically, Blake belongs – or began – in the Revolutionary generation, when the closed heroic couplet was exhausted, and new subjects and new rhythms were being sought out. The cadences of the Bible, the misunderstood Milton and the poetic Shakespeare with his fellow Elizabethans were Blake's staples from the first; to them we must add the wildness of Ossian, the music of Chatterton, the balladry of Percy's Reliques, and the Gothic fiction of Walpole. All the principles of Romanticism are to be found in Blake's first book."

Harold Bloom is also in agreement with this assessment, seeing the book as very much of its particular epoch; a period he dates from the death of Alexander Pope in 1744 to the first major poetry of William Wordsworth in 1789. Bloom sees Sketches as "a workshop of Blake's developing imaginative ambitions as he both follows the poets of sensibility in their imitations of Spenser, Shakespeare and Milton, and goes beyond them in venturing more strenuously on the Hebraic sublime [...] Perhaps the unique freshness of Poetical Sketches can be epitomised by noting Blake's first achievements in the greatest of his projects: to give definite form to the strong workings of imagination that produced the cloudy sublime images of the earlier poets of sensibility. In the best poems of Blake's youth, the sublime feelings of poets like Gray and Collins find a radiant adequacy of visionary outline."

Frye, Damon and Bloom are all in agreement that Blake was, at least originally, very much of his age, but this is by no means a universally accepted opinion. Peter Ackroyd, for example, sees the poems as fundamentally divorced from the dominant poetic formulas of the day. Speaking of 'To the Evening Star' in specific and Poetical Sketches in general, Ackroyd argues that "it would be quite wrong to approach Blake's poetry with a Romantic belief that he is engaged in an act of confessional lyricism or brooding introversion [...] This is not the poetry of a melancholy or self-absorbed youth."

Susan J. Wolfson goes even further, seeing the volume as a statement of Blake's antipathy towards the conventions of the day and an expression of his own sense of artistic aloofness; "He serves up stanzas that cheerfully violate their paradigms, or refuse rhyme, or off-rhyme, or play with eye-rhymes; rhythms that disrupt metrical convention, and line-endings so unorthodox as to strain a practice of enjambment already controversial in eighteenth century poetics."

Similarly, W. H. Stevenson argues that "there is little direct borrowing, and it would be truer to say that, even at this early stage, he is experimenting with verse forms and has formed for himself a style as individual as Collin's and Akenside's".

== Contents ==
Poetical Sketches consists of nineteen lyric poems, a dramatic fragment (King Edward the Third), a prologue to another play in blank verse ('Prologue, Intended for a dramatic piece of King Edward the Fourth'), a prose poem prologue ('Prologue to King John'), a ballad ('A War Song to Englishmen') and three prose poems ('The Couch of Death', 'Contemplation', and 'Samson').

The nineteen lyric poems are grouped together under the title "Miscellaneous Poems":

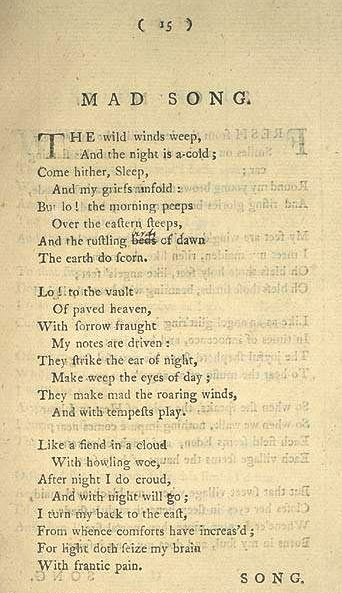
Page from an original 1783 edition of Poetical Sketches showing 'Mad Song' (note the handwritten correction in line 7; "beds" has been changed to "bryds")

- 'To Spring'
- 'To Summer'
- 'To Autumn'
- 'To Winter'
- 'To the Evening Star'
- 'To Morning'
- 'Fair Elenor'
- 'Song: "How sweet I roam'd from field to field'"
- 'Song: "My silks and fine array'"
- 'Song: "Love and harmony combine'"
- 'Song: "I love the jocund dance'"
- 'Song: "Memory, hither come'"
- 'Mad Song'
- 'Song: "Fresh from the dewy hill, the merry year'"
- 'Song: "When early morn walks forth in the sober grey'"
- 'To the Muses'
- 'Gwin, King of Norway'
- 'An Imitation of Spencer' [sic]
- 'Blind-man's Buff'

The work begins with an 'Advertisement' which explains that the contents were written by Blake in his youth and, therefore, any "irregularities and defects" should be forgiven:

The following sketches were the production of untutored youth, commenced in his twelfth, and occasionally resumed by the author till his twentieth year; since which time, his talents having been wholly directed to the attainment of excellence in his profession, he has been deprived of the leisure requisite to such a revisal of these sheets as might have rendered them less unfit to meet the public eye. Conscious of the irregularities and defects to be found in almost every page, his friends have still believed that they possessed a poetical originality, which merited some respite from oblivion. These their opinions remain, however, to be now reproved or confirmed by a less partial public.

According to J.T. Smith, the advertisement was written by "Henry Mathew", which most critics take to mean Anthony Stephen Mathew; "Mrs Mathew was so extremely zealous in promoting the celebrity of Blake, that upon hearing him read some of his earlier efforts in poetry, she thought so well of them as to request the Rev. Henry Mathew, her husband, to join Mr. Flaxman in his truly kind offer of defraying the expense of printing them; in which he not only acquiesced, but with his usual urbanity, wrote the following advertisement."

The following year, in 1784, Flaxman sounded a similar sentiment in a letter to William Hayley accompanying a copy of the book; "his education will plead sufficient excuse to your liberal mind for the defects of his work."

=== 'To Spring', 'To Summer', 'To Autumn', 'To Winter' ===
The opening four poems, invocations to the four seasons, are often seen as offering early versions of four of the figures of Blake's later mythology, each one represented by the respective season, where "abstract personifications merge into the figures of a new myth." Spring seems to predict Tharmas, the peaceful embodiment of sensation, who comes to heal "our love-sick land that mourns" with "soft kisses on her bosom." Summer is perhaps an early version of Orc, the spirit of Revolution, and is depicted as a strong youth with "ruddy limbs and flourishing hair", who brings out artists' passions and inspires them to create. In later poems, Orc's fiery red hair is often mentioned as one of his most distinguishing characteristics; "The fiery limbs, the flaming hair, shot like the sinking sun into the western sea" (The Marriage of Heaven and Hell, 25:13). Autumn seems to predict Los, the prophetic genius and embodiment of imagination, as it is the only one of the four seasons Blake allows to speak directly, which it does in a "jolly voice." Finally, Winter serves as an antecedent for Urizen, limiter of men's desires and embodiment of tradition and conventionality, insofar as winter is depicted as a giant who "strides o'er the groaning rocks;/He withers all in silence, and his hand/Unclothes the earth, and freezes up frail life." In The Book of Urizen (1795), Urizen is depicted as a giant striding over the land spreading winter throughout the cities of men (Chap. VIII: Verse 6).

=== 'To the Evening Star' ===
Possibly inspired by Spenser's "Epithalamion" (c.1597), lines 285-295, 'To the Evening Star' is described by S. Foster Damon as "pure Romanticism, way ahead of its time." Harold Bloom identifies it as perhaps Blake's earliest Song of Innocence in its presentation of a pastoral vision of calm and harmony;

Smile on our loves; and, while thou drawest the
Blue curtains of the sky, scatter thy silver dew
On every flower that shuts its sweet eyes
In timely sleep. [...]

— Lines 5-8

=== 'Fair Elenor' ===
'Fair Elenor' has attracted critical attention insofar as it is one of the very few poems in Blake's œuvre written in a specific genre; in this case, the genre is Gothic, and the poem adheres to its conventions so rigidly, it may in fact be a parody. The opening lines, for example, are almost clichéd in their observance of Gothic conventions;

The bell struck one, and shook the silent tower;
The graves give up their dead: fair Elenor
Walk'd by the castle gate, and looked in.
A hollow groan ran thro' the dreary vaults.

— Lines 1-4

=== 'Song: "How sweet I roam'd from field to field"' ===
According to Benjamin Heath Malkin, this poem was written prior to Blake's fourteenth birthday, and as such, "How sweet" may be his oldest extant poem. Despite his young age, the poem includes allusions to mythological figures such as Eros, Cupid and Psyche. Bloom sees it as Blake's first Song of Experience.

He loves to sit and hear me sing,
Then, laughing, sports and plays with me;
Then stretches out my golden wing,
And mocks my loss of liberty.

— Lines 13-16

Northrop Frye argues that the poem functions as a precursor to Blake's version of the Phaëton myth in 'Night the Second' of Vala, or The Four Zoas (1796), where the sun is seized by Luvah (representative of love and passion). Damon reads it as "a protest against marriage," and notes that the imagery in the poem, particularly the phrases "silken net" and "golden cage" predict Blake's later metaphorical uses of nets and enclosures. For example, in The Book of Urizen, after the Fall of Los and Urizen, and the birth of Enitharmon and Orc, the Eternals cover mortal earth with a roof "called Science" (Chap: V: Verse 12). Subsequently, after exploring the earth, Urizen spreads out "the net of Religion" (Chap VIII: Verse 9).

=== 'Song: "My silks and fine array"' ===
"A pastiche of Elizabethan imagery", possibly to the point of parody, "My silks" deals with the popular Elizabethan topic of the transience of love;

When I my grave have made,
Let winds and tempests beat:
Then down I'll lie, as cold as clay.
True love doth pass away!

— Lines 15-18

=== 'Song: "Love and harmony combine"' and 'Song: "I love the jocund dance"' ===
"My silks and fine array" contrasts sharply with the next two poems; "Song: 'Love and harmony combine'", which celebrates a natural love in which the lovers are depicted as trees with intertwining branches and roots ("Love and harmony combine,/And around our souls intwine,/While together thy branches mix with mine,/And our roots together join") and the similarly themed "Song: 'I love the jocund dance'" ("I love our neighbours all,/But, Kitty, I better love thee;/And love them I ever shall;/But thou art all to me").

W. H. Stevenson speculates that Kitty could be Blake's future wife, Catherine Blake.

=== 'Mad Song' ===
'Mad Song' is often regarded as Blake's first satire. Harold Bloom, who feels it is the most "Blakean" poem in Poetical Sketches refers to it as an "intellectual satire" on both the concept of mad songs (six of which appeared in Percy's Antiques, which describes madness as being a peculiarly English theme) and the world which the singer seeks to leave. Frye is also an admirer of the poem and argues that "a maddened world of storm and tempest is the objective counterpart of madness in the human mind; and the madman is mad because he is locked up in his own Selfhood or inside, and cannot bear to see anything. In order to have his world a consistently dark one, he is compelled to rush frantically around the spinning earth forever, keeping one jump ahead of the rising sun, unable even to sleep in his everlasting night." Alexander Lincoln likens the poem to 'Song: "How Sweet I roam'd from field to field"' insofar as both deal with "states of mental captivity described from within."

=== 'Song: "Fresh from the dewy hill, the merry year"' and 'Song: "When early morn walks forth in sober grey"' ===
As with the contrast between "My silks and fine array" on one hand and "Love and harmony combine" and "I love the jocund dance" on the other, Blake again opposes the pleasure of love with its opposite in 'Song: "Fresh from the dewy hill, the merry year'" and 'Song: "When early morn walks forth in sober grey"'. In particular, the third stanza of each poem stands in diametric opposition to one another. The first reads

So when she speaks, the voice of Heaven I hear
So when we walk, nothing impure comes near;
Each field seems Eden, and each calm retreat;
Each village seems the haunt of holy feet.

— Lines 13-16

This is strongly contrasted with the following song:

Oft when the summer sleeps among the trees,
Whisp'ring faint murmurs to the scanty breeze,
I walk the village round; if at her side
A youth doth walk in stolen joy and pride,
I curse my stars in bitter grief and woe,
That made my love so high, and me so low.

— Lines 11-16

Northrop Frye calls the contrasts between these various poems an "attempt to work out an antithesis of innocence and experience," and as such, they serve as a thematic antecedent of Blake's later work.

=== 'To the Muses' ===
'To The Muses' represents an attack on contemporary poetry, using the language and cadence of Augustan verse to mock that very style of writing. Blake describes how the nine muses, once so active amongst the poets of old, now seem to have left the earth;

How have you left the antient love
That bards of old enjoy'd in you!
The languid strings do scarcely move!
The sound is forc'd, the notes are few!

— Lines 13-16

The poem also contains Blake's first reference to a topic with which he would deal several times in his subsequent work; the four elements, water, air, fire and earth (although he replaces fire with Heaven);

Whether in Heav'n ye wander fair,
Or the green corners of the earth,
Or the blue regions of the air,
Where the melodious winds have birth;

Whether on chrystal rocks ye rove,
Beneath the bosom of the sea
Wand'ring in many a coral grove [...]

— Lines 5-11

In For Children: The Gates of Paradise (1793), Blake would assign each element a visual representation. In The Book of Urizen, the four elements are personified as the sons of Urizen (Utha is water, Thiriel is air, Fuzon is fire and Grodna is earth). In Jerusalem The Emanation of the Giant Albion (1820), Blake describes the original formation of the elements (30:27-40).

=== 'Gwin, King of Norway' ===
Presented as a warning for tyrannical kings, the longer lyric poem 'Gwin, King of Norway' represents Blake's first engagement with revolution, a theme which would become increasingly important in his later verse, such as America a Prophecy (1793), Europe a Prophecy (1794), The Song of Los (1795) and The Book of Ahania (1795). In 'Gwin', Blake points out how the ordinary man must become a revolutionary to suppress political tyranny;

The husbandman does leave his plow,
To wade thro' fields of gore;
The merchant binds his brows in steel,
And leaves the trading shore:

The shepherd leaves his mellow pipe,
And sounds the trumpet shrill;
The workman throws his hammer down
To heave the bloody bill.

— Lines 45-52

For Frye, "Gordred the giant leads a workers' revolution [...] the rebellion seems to be largely a middle class one in which the stronghold of political liberty is the independent yeoman." David V. Erdman sees the poem as a direct antecedent of America and thus containing allusions to the American Revolution; England's actions prior to and during the war received widespread condemnation from the majority of the people, especially in London, where numerous protests were held against it. Blake was very much of the popular opinion that England was the oppressor and that the American people were fighting a righteous battle for their freedom. Erdman argues that in 'Gwin', "the geography is sufficiently obscure so that "the nations of the North" oppressed by King Gwin may easily be compared to the nations of North America oppressed by King George [...] In 'Gwin', the rising up of the oppressed behind the "troubl'd banners" of their deliverer "Gordred the giant" parallels the hope that some American champion would prove the Samson of the New World." Erdman thus compares Gordred with George Washington and Thomas Paine. Susan J. Wolfson also sees the poem as primarily metaphorical; "the revenge-tale enacted by two symbolic figures is less the ballad's point than the universal carnage that displaces all hope of political reform […] this bloodbath may not so much pale politics into visionary history as evoke an appalling visionary politics, a transhistorical anxiety about the human cost of historical conflict."

The name Gordred was probably taken from Chatterton's 'Godred Crovan' (1768). Margaret Ruth Lowery suggests that Blake took more from Chatterton than simply the name of Gordred, arguing that there are many parallels in theme and imagery between Chatterton's story of a Norse tyrant invading the Isle of Man, and Blake's of a revolution against a Norse tyrant.

=== 'An Imitation of Spencer' ===
Alicia Ostriker sees 'An Imitation of Spencer' as "an early attempt on Blake's part to define his poetic vocation." The poem follows 'To the Muses' in its mockery of Augustan poetry, accusing such poetry of consisting of "tinkling rhimes and elegances terse." This is contrasted with the power of more accomplished poetry;

Such is sweet Eloquence, that does dispel
Envy and Hate, that thirst for human gore:
And cause in sweet society to dwell
Vile savage minds that lurk in lonely cell.

— Lines 31-34

=== 'Blind-Man's Bluff' ===
Predicting the close bond between form and content which would prove so important an aspect of his later Illuminated Books, in this simple story of a children's game, Blake uses the structure to carry his metaphorical intent; "Blake's tidy couplets report a game of all sound and no eye, where tyranny and wanton cruelty ensue, provoking a summary call for law and order and fair play […] Miming the forms of children's rhymes, he even implies the genesis of man's designs in childish games, whose local mischief, tricks and blood-letting confusions rehearse worldly power-plays." This is most evident in the poem's concluding lines:

Such are the fortunes of the game,
And those who play should stop the same
By wholesome laws; such as: all those
Who on the blinded man impose,
Stand in his stead; as long a-gone
When men were first a nation grown;
Lawless they liv'd—till wantonness
And liberty began t' increase;
And one man lay in another's way,
Then laws were made to keep fair play.

— Lines 61-70

=== King Edward the Third ===
The unfinished dramatic fragment King Edward the Third is a Shakespearean-inspired ironic depiction of Edward III's war with France which began in 1337. Written in loose blank verse, the play is set the night before the Battle of Crécy, a significant turning point in the Hundred Years' War. Blake ironically presents the invasion as a noble crusade for Liberty, which is spoken of as a commercial value by the English lords. For example, several times they boast that England is the home of Liberty and is protected by Liberty, yet they also proudly claim that "England is the land favour'd by Commerce" (Sc.2 l.30). This treatment of Liberty has been identified as mockery of a similar, but non-ironic, treatment in James Thomson's Liberty (1735), e.g. "Cressy, Poitiers, Agincourt proclaim/What Kings supported by almighty love/And people fired with liberty can do" (iv:865-867).

The character of William his Man may be a representative of Blake himself, as he is the only character in the play who questions the morality of the invasion beyond the ostensible explanation of Liberty; "I should be glad to know if it was not ambition that brought over our King to France to fight for his right" (Sc.4: ll.20-21).

Beyond the investigation into notions of Liberty and the reasons for the invasion, David V. Erdman argues that the theme of the play is the bloodshed and hardship for the common people which will result, despite Edward's belief that the war provides ordinary men with a chance to be heroes; "the key to the [play] is the great Death which lies in wait for the warriors of Edward's ill-starred invasion of France." Erdman believes the play is wholly ironic, and challenges critics who have read it literally and accused it of jingoism. Margaret Ruth Lowery, for example, believes that it expresses "a 'boylike' delight in the picturesqueness of war." S. Foster Damon calls it "uncritically patriotic." Mark Schorer interprets it as an "extended defence of war and national interests." Northrop Frye sees it as "Rule, Britannia! in blank verse." He further states, "the most puzzling feature of King Edward the Third is the frankness with which Blake admits that economic conditions are the cause of the war. Industry, commerce, agriculture, manufacture and trade are the gods directing the conflict, but the conflict is glorious and the gods worthy of worship. There seems to be no use looking for irony here."

Erdman, however, sees it as impossible that the author of such bitter and anti-imperialist tracts as 'Prologue, Intended for a dramatic piece of King Edward the Fourth', 'Prologue to King John' and 'Couch of Death', could possibly be expressing genuine sentiments in this apparent celebration of jingoism. Instead, Erdman argues that "there are many indications of Blake's general prophetic intent in these scenes; yet if we forget to ask what historical climax they point toward, we may be quite puzzled that Blake's Edward and his brave and battle-ready warriors appear to be undertaking their invasion of the vineyards of France under favourable auspices, marching with jingoistic complacency towards a great slaughter of enemy troops and to be getting by what they represent to each other as glorious and fully justifiable murder." Similarly, Alicia Ostriker refers to the piece as "an ironic treatment of military values urged in the name of high ideals."

Regarding the fact that Blake never completed the play, and hence did not depict the English victory, Susan J. Wolfson argues that "Blake's refusal to report these outcomes functions systematically as a refusal of triumphalism, the mode of nationalistic self-satisfaction. His sketch draws us in, instead, to the various critical perspectives on the interests that impel England's history of military adventurism." She goes on to point out that "Blake's perspective is not the conservative lens of eighteenth-century formalism that would expose liberty as lawlessness, but a modern lens of suspicion about the motivated rhetoric, craft and intentional designs in the cant of Liberty."

=== 'Prologue, Intended for a dramatic piece of King Edward the Fourth' and 'Prologue to King John' ===
The moral judgements which are kept implicit in King Edward the Third are made very much explicit in 'Prologue, Intended for a dramatic piece of King Edward the Fourth' and 'Prologue to King John'. 'Edward the Fourth', which Frye calls "the first real statement of Blake's revolutionary politics," uses the refrain "Who can stand" to enquire into the possibility of nobility amidst war and destruction. It then imagines that even God wonders from where all the conflict has come, with Blake pointing his finger directly at those he holds responsible;

O who hath caused this?
O who can answer at the throne of God?
The Kings and Nobles of the Land have done it!
Hear it not, Heaven, thy Ministers have done it!

— Lines 13-16

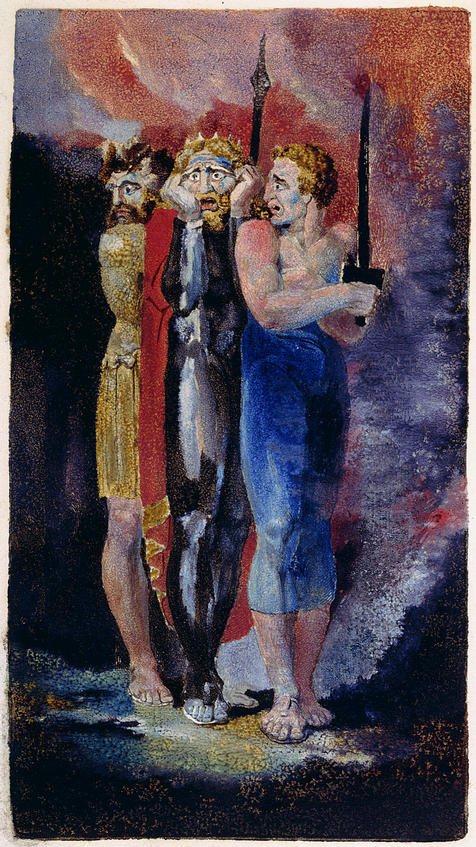
When the senses are shaken (British Museum), a colour intaglio etching from A Large Book of Designs (c.1796); 2nd state of a piece also known as Our End is come (1st state - 1793) and The Accusers of Theft Adultery Murder: A Scene in the Last Judgement (3rd state - c.1809)

Blake was evidently quite proud of this piece as c.1796, he inscribed a colour etching with "When the senses are shaken/And the Soul is driven to madness. Page 56". This is a reference to the original publication of Poetical Sketches and refers to lines 2-3 of 'Edward the Fourth'.

In 'King John', which Erdman reads as a document of English protest against the American War, Blake becomes even more explicit regarding his detestation of war. Depicting an almost apocalyptical wilderness, Blake laments how "brother in brother's blood must bathe." England has become a place where "the sucking infant lives to die in battle; the weeping mother feeds him for the slaughter" and "the trembling sinews of old age must work the work of death against their progeny." However, the poem concludes on an optimistic note; "O yet may Albion smile again, and stretch her peaceful arms and raise her golden head, exultingly." The source for this possibility of renewal however is never revealed.

=== 'The Couch of Death' and 'A War Song to Englishmen' ===
Erdman believes that the prose poem 'The Couch of Death' is a coda to Edward the Third, insofar as it depicts the victims of the plague and hardship brought about by the war.

The ballad 'A War Song to Englishmen' is usually interpreted as forming a part of Edward the Third, perhaps written by Blake to be inserted later. Specifically, the poem is seen as the second song of the minstrel, whose first song closes the fragment with a passionate evocation of Brutus of Troy, the supposed founder of Britain. "War Song" continues to urge troops to battle and, like the minstrel's first song, is usually interpreted as parody and an ironic celebration of patriotic bloodlust. Erdman interprets it as "a parody of the battle songs of modern Britain."

=== 'Samson' ===
The final piece in the volume, 'Samson', has received little critical attention over the years. Andrew Lincoln, however, has identified it as perhaps introducing a pseudo-biographical element into Blake's work and argues that it "is an early experiment in prophetic narrative. Blake's Samson can be seen as a type of the artist who struggles against the materialism of his own age – and is doomed to be seduced by it before finally achieving his mission. The vulnerability of the would-be deliverer suggests that spiritual captivity is a state through which the strongest of mortals must pass." In Milton (1810), Blake would again allude to the Samson legend, referring to Emanuel Swedenborg as "the strongest of men, the Samson shorn by the Churches" (22:50).

== Additional Content ==
On the blank leaves of a copy of Poetical Sketches inscribed "from Mrs Flaxman May 15, 1784", are three handwritten poems which, since John Sampson in 1905, have been attributed to Blake. The three poems, "Song 1st by a shepherd", "Song 2nd by a Yound Shepherd" [sic] and "Song 3^{d} by an old shepherd" are not in Blake's handwriting, but are thought to be of his composition insofar as "Song 2nd" is an early draft of "Laughing Song" from Songs of Innocence (1789).

In his 1965 edition of the Complete Poetry & Prose of William Blake, David Erdman assigns two additional incomplete prose poems to Poetical Sketches, under the section title 'Further Sketches'; "then She bore Pale desire…" and "Woe cried the muse…". These two poems are extant on seven MS pages in Blake's handwriting and dateable to the early 1780s, but nothing else is known about them.

Erdman includes the two pieces in Poetical Sketches simply because there is no other collection with which to associate them. His decision, however, is by no means the norm amongst Blake's editors. For example, R.H. Shepherd did not include them in his publication of Poetical Sketches in 1868. In his 1905 edition of the collected works, Sampson mentioned them in his Introduction to Poetical Sketches but did not include them in the collection itself. In The Complete Writings of William Blake (1957 and 1966) Geoffrey Keynes included them but divided them from Poetical Sketches, indexed them separately and dated them both 1777. Alicia Ostriker, in her William Blake: The Complete Poems (1977), makes no reference at all to either piece throughout the volume. W.H. Stevenson in Blake: The Complete Poems (1971, 1989 and 2007), mentions them in a footnote, but does not reproduce them.

"then She bore pale desire" was first published in 1904, by William Michael Rossetti in the August edition of The Monthly Review, where it was rewritten into verse and appeared under the title The Passions (which is also the name used by Gilchrist). "Woe cried the muse" was first published in 1925 in Geoffrey Keynes' The Writings of William Blake.

"then She bore Pale desire…" begins with a small letter and the first line is not indented, so it is clear that at least one page is missing. Harold Bloom believes it to be an experiment in stream of consciousness writing. According to Erdman, it is "an allegorical genealogy of Pride and Shame and Policy and "the Kingdoms of the World & all their Glory," it shows Blake revolving the problem of man's fate in terms that link imperial pride and individual frustration." For Damon, it is an attempt "to outline the spiritual decay of mankind in the course of history."
