= Fuzon (Blake) =

Character in the writings of William Blake

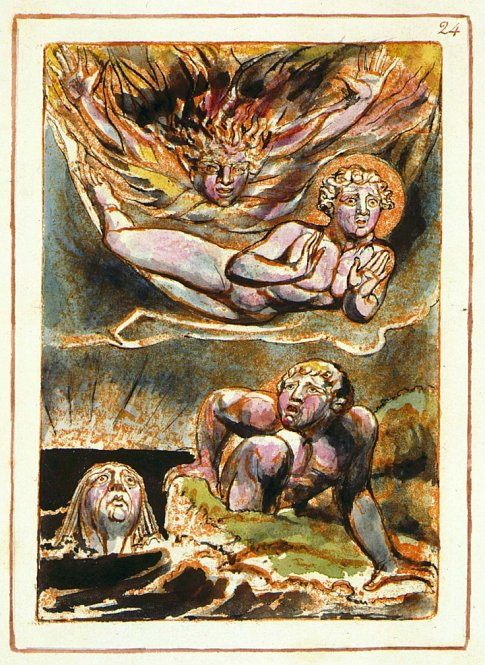
The birth of the sons of Urizen, depicted in The Book of Urizen, copy G, collection the Library of Congress. Fuzon appears at the top, in flames.

In the mythological writings of William Blake, Fuzon is the fourth and final son of Urizen, associated with the classical element of fire. In The Book of Ahania he fights Urizen for control of the world.

== Identifications ==
S. Foster Damon in his Blake Dictionary states that Fuzon represents fire in the four classical elements. His siblings representing the other elements are Utha, Grodna and Thiriel. Damon notes parallels in Greek mythology with the castration of Uranus, by Cronus (Saturn); and in the Freudian Oedipus complex.

David V. Erdman proposed an identification of Fuzon with Robespierre; Harold Bloom supported it as "probable" in "historical allegory", adding that in "moral allegory" he is a "Promethean version of Moses". Northrop Frye finds a connection of Fuzon with the biblical Absalom.

== Fuzon the rebel ==
Fuzon appears as a rebel in The Book of Ahania, a sequel of sorts to The Book of Urizen. Hobson writes

If the Fuzon material in Ahania is read continuously with Urizen, the sequence of events is that Orc is bound, and his cries awaken the dead and, by implication, awaken Urizen's sons [...], one of whom, Fuzon, leads the revolt that begins in Urizen [...], and continues in Ahania.

According to Davis, Fuzon, who leads an exodus of children of Urizen as a pillar of fire, is an "Orc-like rebel who represents Passion".

Fuzon's fate is bound up with the Tree of Mystery, introduced in the poem The Human Abstract. Urizen shoots Fuzon with a poisoned rock, and crucifies him on the Tree, for a period of forty years.
