= 1795 in Great Britain =

1795 vertical sundial on St Breaca's, Breage, Cornwall, England.

Events from the year 1795 in Great Britain.

== Incumbents ==
- Monarch – George III
- Prime Minister – William Pitt the Younger (Tory)
- Foreign Secretary – Lord Grenville

== Events ==
- January – the coldest month ever in the Central England temperature series with an average of −3.1 °C or 26.4 °F.
- 18 January – William V, Prince of Orange, flees the Dutch Republic for exile at Kew.
- 10 to 12 February – great floods on the Rivers Severn and Wye result from ice breakup, snowmelt and heavy rainfall; many bridges damaged.
- March
  - Approximate date of start of "Revolt of the housewives", a series of food riots across England.
  - Quota Acts oblige magistrates to find a specified quota of men to serve in the Royal Navy.
  - English Benedictine monks expelled from the Priory of St. Gregory's at Douai, France are permitted to proceed to England where they settle as guests of Sir Edward Smythe at Acton Burnell, Shropshire; later they will establish Downside Abbey in Somerset. This year also English Benedictine nuns expelled from the Priory of Our Lady of Good Hope in Paris settle initially in Dorset; later they will form Saint Mary's Abbey, Colwich.
- 13–14 March – Battle of Genoa: the British and Neapolitan fleets are victorious over the French.
- April – the British Army is evacuated from Bremen, having been unsuccessful in the Flanders Campaign under Prince Frederick, Duke of York.
- 8 April – marriage of George, Prince of Wales, to his cousin Caroline of Brunswick at St James's Palace on the promise of being relieved of his debts; the couple separate after a year.
- 23 April – former Governor-General of India Warren Hastings acquitted by the House of Lords of misconduct.
- 28 April – Vagrant Act provides for magistrates to enrol vagrants and smugglers into the Royal Navy as an alternative to judicial punishment.
- 5 May – a tax on hair-powder under the Duty on Hair Powder Act 1795 comes into effect, helping to end the fashion for powdering hair and wigs.
- 6 May – introduction of Speenhamland system of outdoor relief for the poor (originally by magistrates meeting at the Pelican Inn, Speenhamland, Berkshire).
- 16–17 June – French Revolutionary Wars: Cornwallis's Retreat – a British Royal Navy battle squadron commanded by William Cornwallis fends off a numerically superior French Navy fleet off the coast of Brittany.
- July to September – a Newcomen atmospheric engine begins pumping at Elsecar New Colliery in the South Yorkshire Coalfield; 220 years later it will be the only operable example on its original site.
- 25 August – British forces capture Trincomalee in Ceylon.
- September and October
  - Riots over shortages of bread in many towns across Britain.
  - Only 12.9 millimetres or 0.51 inches of rain fall in September but as much as 173.2 millimetres or 6.82 inches in October, creating the largest month-to-month rise in the England and Wales Precipitation series.
- 16 September – British forces capture Cape Town from the Netherlands.
- 22 September – London Missionary Society inaugurated.
- 28 September – the Alliance of St Petersburg formed between Britain, Russia and Austria against France.
- 2 October – British forces capture Ile d'Yeu, off the coast of Brittany.
- 29 October – King George pelted with stones by an angry mob as bread riots continue.
- November – Parliament passes the Treasonable Practices Act and the Seditious Meetings Act prohibiting assemblies of more than fifty people.
- 13 December – a meteorite falls at the hamlet of Wold Newton, East Riding of Yorkshire.

=== Ongoing ===
- French Revolutionary Wars, First Coalition

== Publications ==
- Richard Cumberland's novel Henry.
- William Blake's monotypes Nebuchadnezzar, Newton, The Night of Enitharmon's Joy and Pity; and his self-illustrated prophetic poem The Book of Ahania.
- Joseph Ritson's edition Robin Hood: a collection of all the ancient poems, songs and ballads now extant, relative to that celebrated outlaw.

== Births ==
- 5 April – Henry Havelock, general (died 1857)
- 25 May – George Meikle Kemp, architect (died 1844)
- 26 May – Thomas Noon Talfourd, judge and author (died 1854)
- 13 June – Thomas Arnold, historian and school headmaster (died 1842)
- 11 August – Elizabeth Sackville-West, Countess De La Warr, peeress (died 1870)
- 13 September – Julius Hare, theologian (died 1855)
- 24 October – Edwin Norris, philologist, linguist and orientalist (died 1872)
- 31 October – John Keats, poet and leading figure of the Romantic movement (died 1821)
- 10 November – Walter Geikie, painter (died 1837)
- 10 December – Sir George Burns, 1st Baronet, shipping magnate (died 1890)
- 4 December – Thomas Carlyle, historian and philosopher (died 1881)
- 12 December – Jack Russell, parson and dog breeder (died 1883)
- Unknown date – Zephaniah Williams, Welsh chartist (died 1874)

== Deaths ==
- 3 January – Josiah Wedgwood, potter (born 1730)
- 21 January – Samuel Wallis, explorer (born 1728)
- 9 March – John Walsh, scientist (born 1726)
- 23 June – James Craig, Scottish architect (born 1744)
- 3 August – Jerry Abershawe, highwayman, hanged (born 1773)
- 1 October – Robert Bakewell, agriculturalist (born 1725)
- 11 November – George Dixon, sea captain and explorer, died in Bermuda (born 1748)

== See also ==
- 1795 in Wales
