= Fuzon =

Fuzon may refer to:

- Fuzon (Blake), a character from The Book of Ahania by William Blake
- Fuzön, a band from Pakistan
