= The Book of Urizen =

Book by William Blake

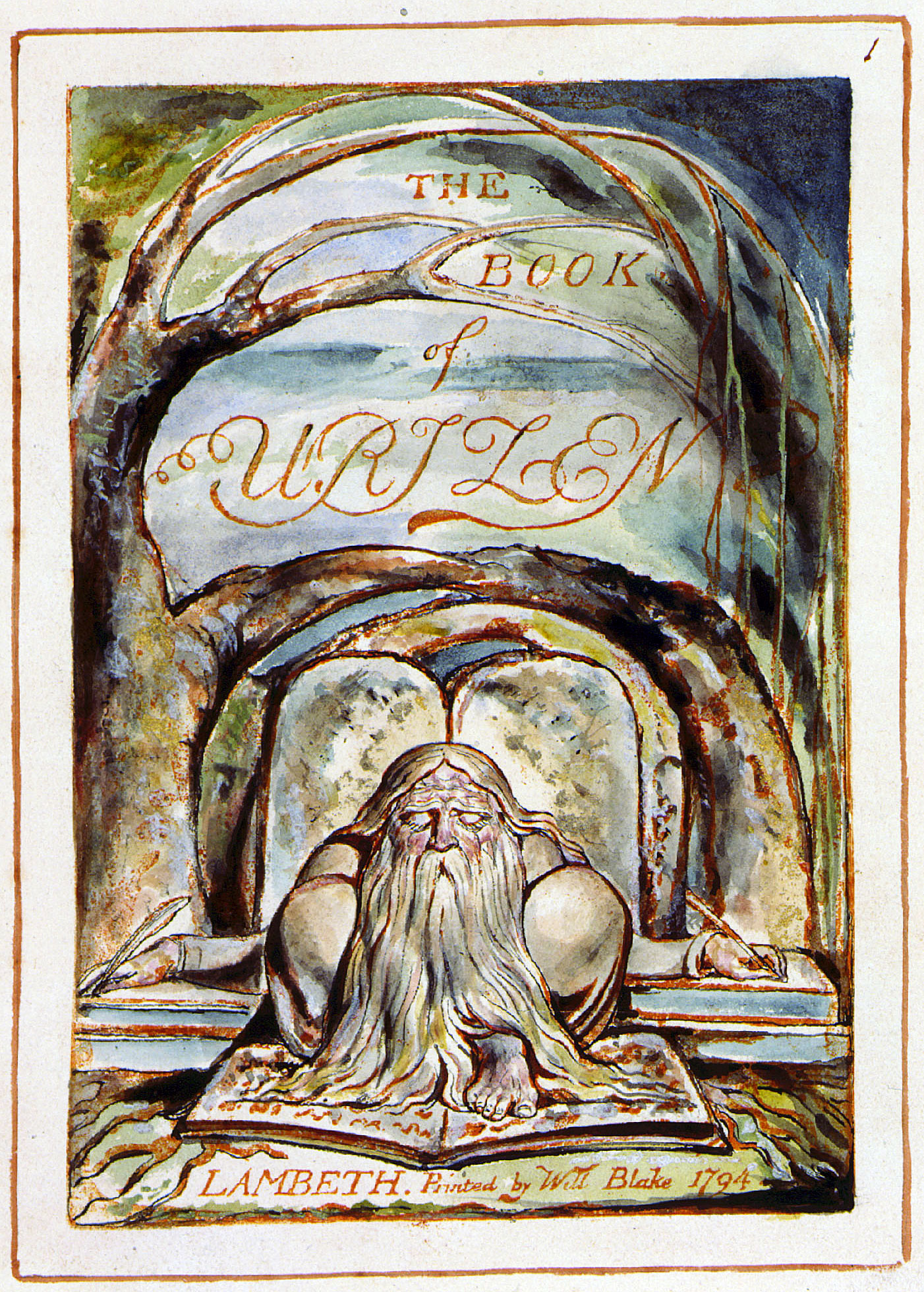
Title page of The Book of Urizen, copy G (printed 1818). In the collection of the Library of Congress.

The Book of Urizen is one of the major prophetic books of the English writer William Blake, illustrated by Blake's own plates. It was originally published as The First Book of Urizen in 1794. Later editions dropped the "First". The book takes its name from the character Urizen in Blake's mythology, who represents alienated reason as the source of oppression. The book describes Urizen as the "primeaval priest" and narrates how he became separated from the other Eternals to create his own alienated and enslaving realm of religious dogma. Los and Enitharmon create a space within Urizen's fallen universe to give birth to their son Orc, the spirit of revolution and freedom.

In form the book is a parody of the Book of Genesis. Urizen's first four sons are Thiriel, Utha, Grodna and Fuzon (respectively elemental Air, Water, Earth, Fire, according to Chapter VIII). The last of these plays a major role in The Book of Ahania, published in 1795.

== Background ==
In autumn 1790 Blake moved to Lambeth in south London. In the studio of his new house he wrote what became known as his "Lambeth Books", which included The Book of Urizen. In all these books, Blake completed their design composition, their printing and colouring, and their sales from that house. Blake included early sketches for The Book of Urizen in a notebook containing images created between 1790 and 1793. The Book of Urizen was one of the few works that Blake describes as "illuminated printing", one of his colour printed works with the coloured ink being placed on the copperplate before the page was printed.

The Book of Urizen was printed from 1794 until 1818 and was larger than his America, A Prophecy. Only eight copies of the work survive, with many variations between them of the plate orders and the number of plates. All the surviving copies were colour-printed.

== Poem ==
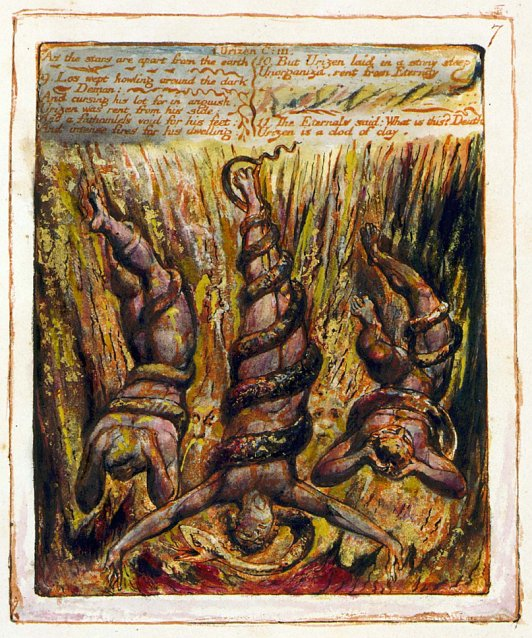
Copy G, plate 7. Urizen is cast out from eternity

The story deals with a struggle within the divine mind to establish and define both itself and the universe. It is a creation myth that begins before creation:

Earth was not: nor globes of attraction
The will of the Immortal expanded
Or contracted his all flexible senses.
Death was not, but eternal life sprung

— Chapter II, stanza 1 (Plate 3, lines 36-39)

The creator is Urizen, a blind exile who was kept from eternity and who establishes a world that he could rule. As such, he creates laws:

Laws of peace, of love, of unity;
Of pity, compassion, forgiveness.
Let each chuse one habitation:
His ancient infinite mansion:
One command, one joy, one desire,
One curse, one weight, one measure
One King, one God, one Law.

— Chapter II, stanza 8 (Plate 4, lines 34-40)

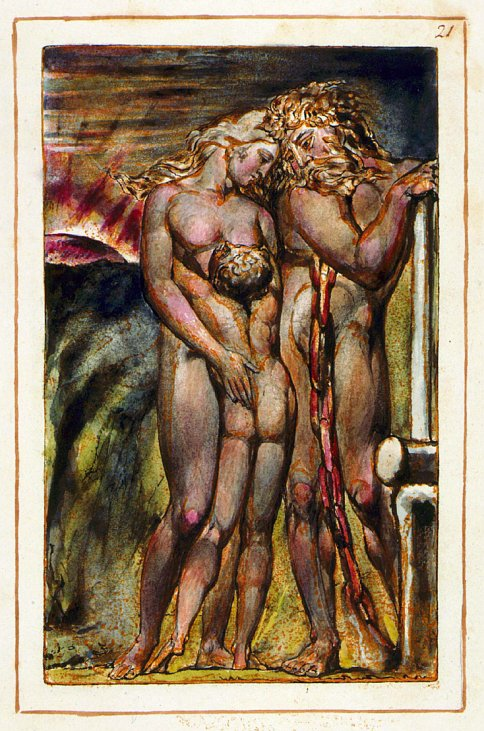
Copy G, plate 21. Los, Enitharmon, and Orc are depicted; Los with his usual attribute of the hammer

However, Urizen suffers a fall when he creates a barrier to protect himself from eternity:

And a roof, vast petrific around,
On all sides He fram'd: like a womb;
...
Like a human heart struggling & beating
The vast world of Urizen appear'd.

— Chapter III, stanza 7 (Plate 5, lines 28-29, 36-37)

He is chained by Los, the prophet, from whom Urizen had been rent:

In chains of the mind locked up,
Like fetters of ice shrinking together,
Disorganiz'd, rent from Eternity.
Los beat on his fetters of iron

— Chapter IV[b], stanza 4 (Plate 10, lines 25-28)

Los forges a human image for Urizen in the course of seven ages but pities him and weeps. From these tears Enitharmon is created, who soon bears the child of Los, Orc. Orc's infant cries awaken Urizen, who begins to survey and measure the world he has created. Urizen explores his world and witnesses the birth of his four sons, who represent the four classical elements. From these experiences Urizen's hopes are crushed:

And his soul sicken'd! he curs'd
Both sons & daughters: for he saw
That no flesh nor spirit could keep
His iron laws one moment.

— Chapter VIII, stanza 4 (Plate 23, lines 23-26)

In response, he creates a web of religion, which serve as chains to the mind.

== Themes ==
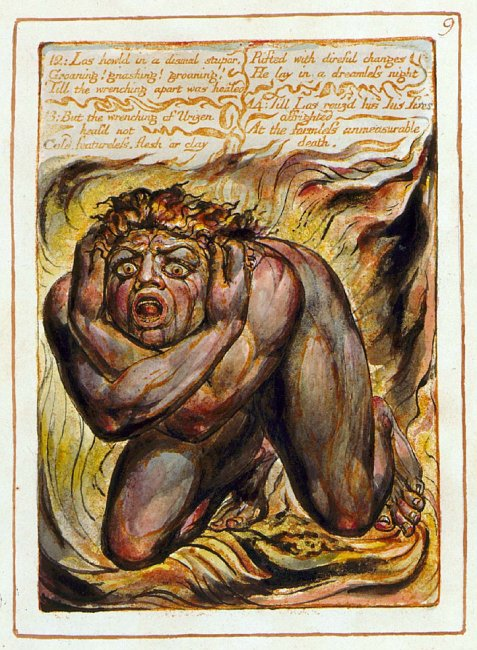
Copy G, plate 9. "Los howld in a dismal stupor, Groaning! gnashing! groaning! Till the wrenching apart was healed But the wrenching of Urizen heal'd not..."

The Book of Urizen is a creation myth that is similar to the Book of Genesis. Blake's myth surrounding Urizen is found in many of his works and can trace back to his experiments in writing myths about a god of reason in the 1780s, including in "To Winter". In the work, Urizen is an eternal self-focused being who creates himself out of eternity. This creation is taken up again in The Four Zoas with a primal man, Albion, being the original form. In this work, it is only Urizen, the representation of abstractions and is an abstraction of the human self. From himself he first divides unknown shapes that begin to torment him. He also turns against the other Eternals and believes himself holy. In contemplating himself, he is able to discover sins and records them in a book of brass that are a combination of Newton, the laws of Moses, and deism that force uniformity. The rest of the Eternals in turn become indignant at Urizen's turning against eternity, and they establish the essence of the sins within living beings. This torments Urizen, who falls into a sleep, which allows Los to appear. Los' duty within the work is to watch over Urizen, and Urizen is seen as an eternal priest while Los takes the position of eternal prophet.

Parts of the story were later revised in The Book of Los and The Book of Ahania, two experimental works. The focus on Urizen emphasises the chains of reason that are imposed on the mind. Urizen, like mankind, is bound by these chains. The point of both The Book of Urizen and the retelling in The Book of Los is to describe how Newtonian reason and the enlightenment view of the universe combine to trap the human imagination. In the Newtonian belief the material universe is connected through an unconscious power which, in turn, characterises imagination and intellect as accidental aspects that result from this. Additionally, imagination and intelligence are secondary to force. This early version of a "survival of the fittest" universe is connected to a fallen world of tyranny and murder in Blake's view.

The poem portrays Orc and his three-stage cycle, whose stages are connected to historical events, although the latter are removed in The Four Zoas. In the beginning is the fall of Urizen, the Satanic force, in a similar way to Milton's Satan. Creation, however, was the fall. Urizen is the representation of abstraction, which is a passive and mental force disconnected from reality. Los, in the fallen world, enters the world as the fire of imaginative energy. However, he too falls and becomes mechanical and regular. Los is the creator of life systems and of the sexes, which leads to the creation of his partner Enitharmon. Eventually, human forms are created, and Orc is born as an evolution of life.

== Critical response ==
Harold Bloom claimed that the poem "is Blake's most powerful illuminated poem before the great abandoned Four Zoas and the epics that followed it."

== See also ==
- List of most expensive books and manuscripts
