= Pity (William Blake) =

Print by William Blake

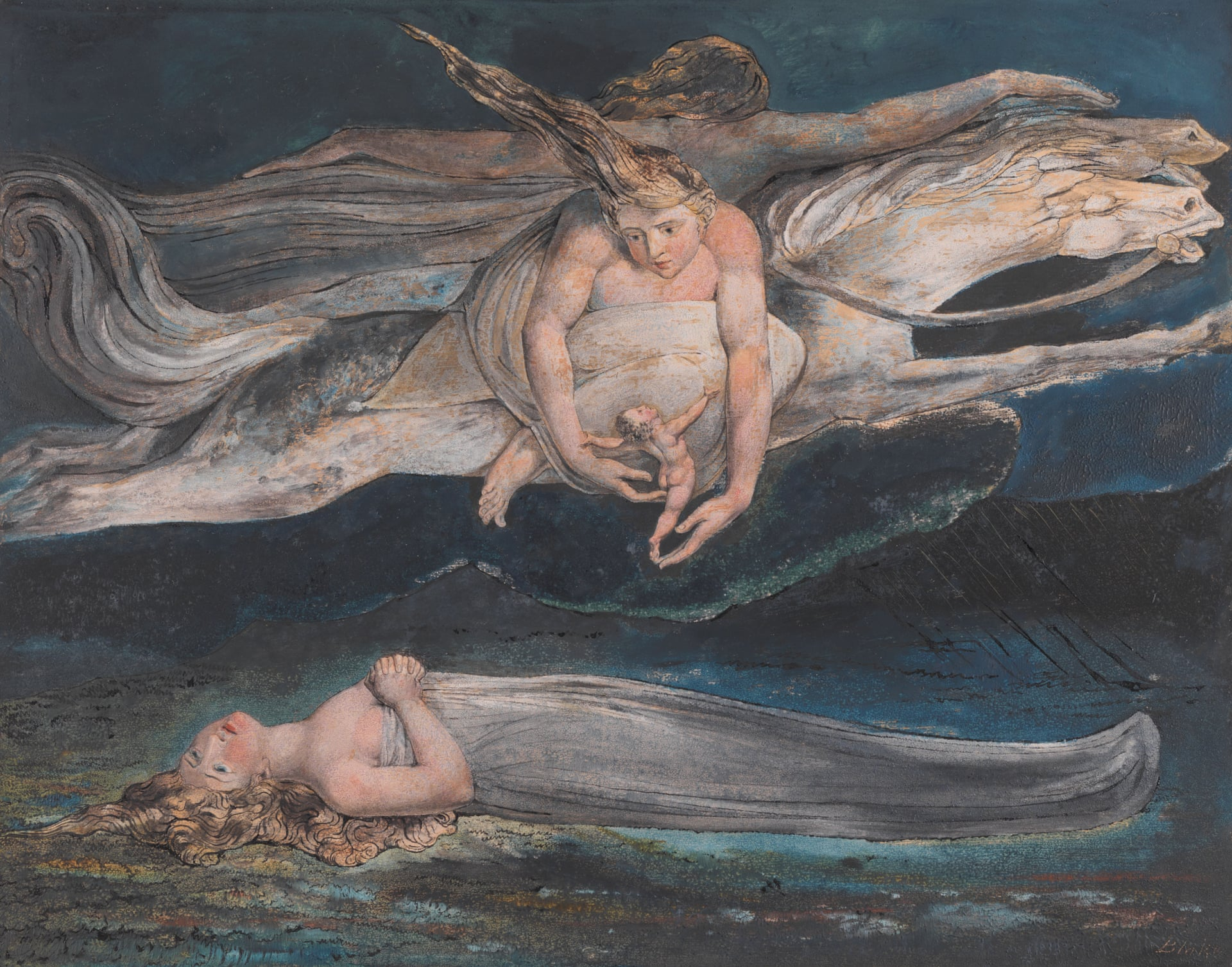
- Artist: William Blake
- Year: 1795
- Type: Colour print, finished in ink and watercolour, on paper
- Dimensions: 42.5 cm × 53.9 cm (16.7 in × 21.2 in)
- Location: Tate Gallery; London

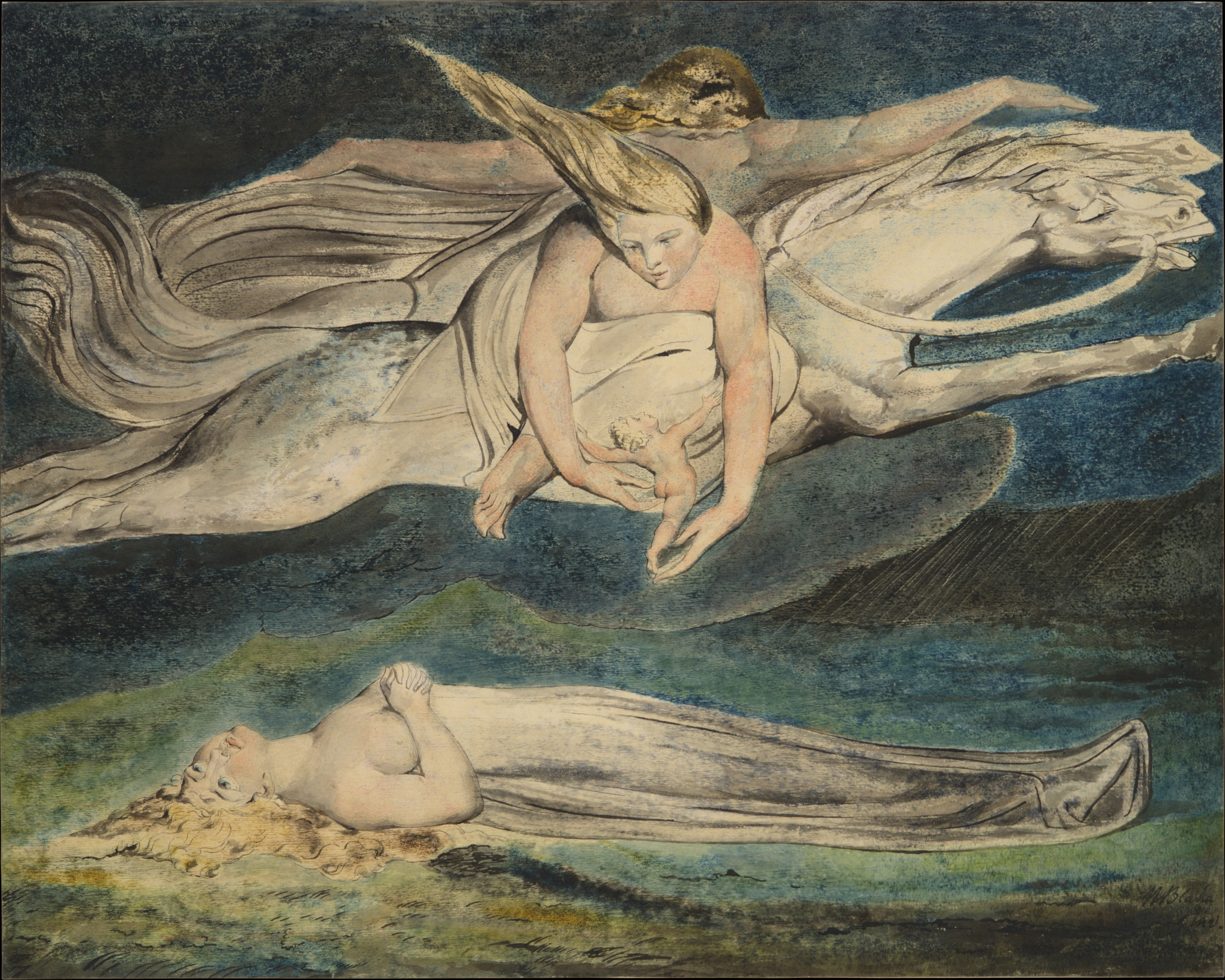
The Metropolitan Museum version of the design

Pity (c. 1795) is a colour print on paper, finished in ink and watercolour, by the English artist and poet William Blake, one of the group known as the "Large Colour Prints". Along with his other works of this period, it was influenced by the Bible, Milton, and Shakespeare. The work is unusual, as it is a literal illustration of a double simile from Macbeth, found in the lines:

And pity, like a naked new-born babe,
Striding the blast, or heaven's cherubim, horsed
Upon the sightless couriers of the air.
- Macbeth (1.7.21–23)

Like other members of the group, it is a monotype produced by printing from a matrix consisting of paint on gessoed millboard, with each impression then finished by hand. Blake could obtain up to three impressions from a single painting by this unusual means. Three such impressions survive of Pity. A fourth, in the British Museum, was an early trial of the design from a different matrix, as it is smaller than the others.

== Interpretations ==
Martin Butlin wrote that this colour print is one of the most inspired of all 'literal' illustrations of a text in the history of art. In fact, "pity and air", two words of Shakespeare's verses, are also two motifs used by Blake in this picture: a female cherub leans down to snatch the baby from its mother. According to Blake's biographer Alexander Gilchrist, the print "is on a tolerably large scale, a woman bending down to succour a man stretched out at length as if given over to death."

Pity is seen as in opposition to Blake's print The Night of Enitharmon's Joy (c. 1795) — which shows a Hecate surrounded by fantastic creatures and macabre elements of a nightmare — because it provides a "possibility of salvation" in the fallen world through pity. Both prints refer to Macbeth. As Nicholas Rawlinson has noted, the play was undergoing a major revival in popularity at the time, being performed nine times in 1795.

It is a personification of a Christian element that some critics argue was a negative virtue for Blake, since pity is associated with "the failure of inspiration and a further dividing" and also "linked by alliteration and capitalization". It is also a part of Blake's mythology, in which a sexually frustrated Tharmas becomes "a terror to all living things", although the emotion inherent in him is a pity. Other Blake characters have this feeling, and his mythology is developed between the confrontation of a feminine "Pity" and a masculine fiery, as happens in the brutal suppression of desire in Urizen.

Some critics see a connection between Pity and the "hypnotic and helpless state" of William Butler Yeats' The Wind Among the Reeds (1899).

== Versions ==
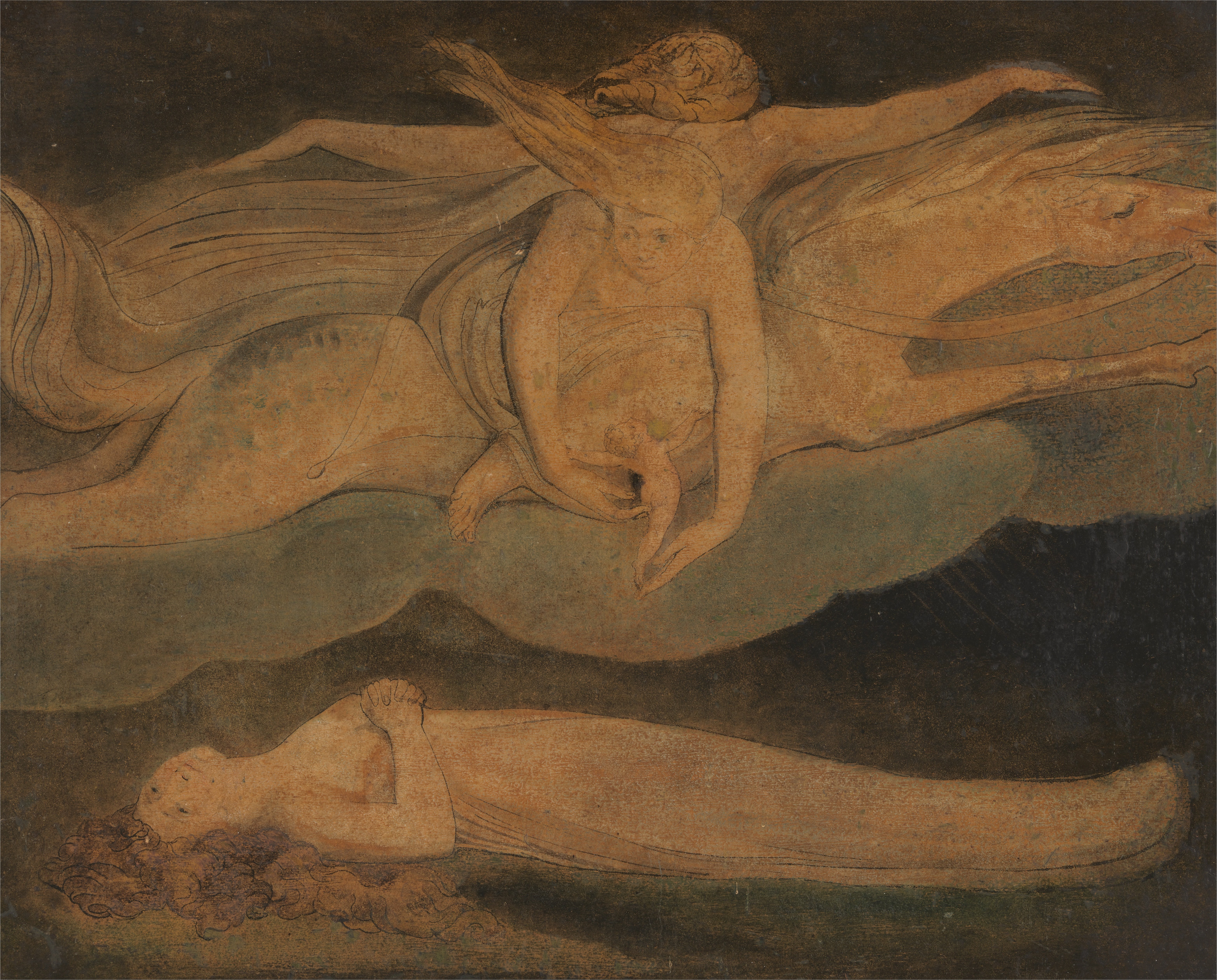
The slightly retouched version at the Yale Center for British Art

The print exists in four versions from two different matrices. The most elaborate and best-known version of the print is in the Tate Gallery, London, sometimes described as the only finished one. It was presented by W. Graham Robertson to the gallery in 1939 and is catalogued as "Butlin 310".

A unique "proof print" is in the British Museum (Butlin 313). It is "significantly smaller than the final version of the design" and depicts the supine figure "partially covered in vegetation" in the form of sweeping fronds of long grass.

Another version of the image is in the collection of the Metropolitan Museum of Art. This is not as elaborately worked as the Tate print. It was donated by Mrs. Robert W. Goelet in 1958.

A lightly retouched version at the Yale Center for British Art also exists, somewhat yellowed by varnish. According to The William Blake Archive, "The characteristics of the colour printing indicate that this impression is the first one printed from the larger matrix in 1795. The second impression in this printing is Pity in the Tate Collection (Butlin 310); the third impression is in the Metropolitan Museum of Art, New York (Butlin 311)."
