= 1725 in Great Britain =

Events from the year 1725 in Great Britain.

== Incumbents ==
- Monarch – George I
- Prime Minister – Robert Walpole (Whig)

== Events ==
- 2 March – in London, a night watchman finds a severed head by the Thames; it is later recognized to be that of the husband of Catherine Hayes. She and an accomplice are executed the following year.
- 12 May – the Black Watch is raised as a military company as part of the pacification of the Scottish Highlands under General George Wade.
- 18 May – the Order of the Bath is founded by King George I.
- 24 May – Jonathan Wild, fraudulent "Thief Taker General", is hanged in Tyburn, for actually aiding criminals.
- 3 September – Treaty of Hanover signed between Great Britain, France and Prussia.
- 20 November – the horse-post from Edinburgh to London vanishes after passing through Berwick-upon-Tweed; horse and rider are thought to have perished on tidal sands near Lindisfarne.

=== Undated ===
- A fire in Wapping, England destroys 70 houses.
- Alexander Pope produces an English language translation of Homer's Odyssey.

== Births ==
- 4 February – Dru Drury, entomologist (died 1804)
- 6 March – Henry Benedict Stuart, cardinal and Jacobite claimant to the British throne (born, and died 1807, in Italy)
- 28 March – Andrew Kippis, non-conformist clergyman and biographer (died 1795)
- 25 April – Augustus Keppel, 1st Viscount Keppel, admiral (died 1786)
- 23 May – Robert Bakewell, agriculturalist (died 1795)
- 1 July – Rhoda Delaval, portrait painter (died 1757)
- 24 July – John Newton, cleric and hymnist (died 1807)
- 29 August – Charles Townshend, politician (died 1767)
- 29 September – Robert Clive, 1st Baron Clive, general and statesman (died 1774)
- 17 October – John Wilkes, politician and journalist (died 1797)
- Paul Sandby, cartographer and painter (died 1809)

== Deaths ==
- 8 April – John Wise, clergyman (born 1652)
- 24 May – Jonathan Wild, criminal (born 1682)

== See also ==
- 1725 in Wales
