= Thiriel =

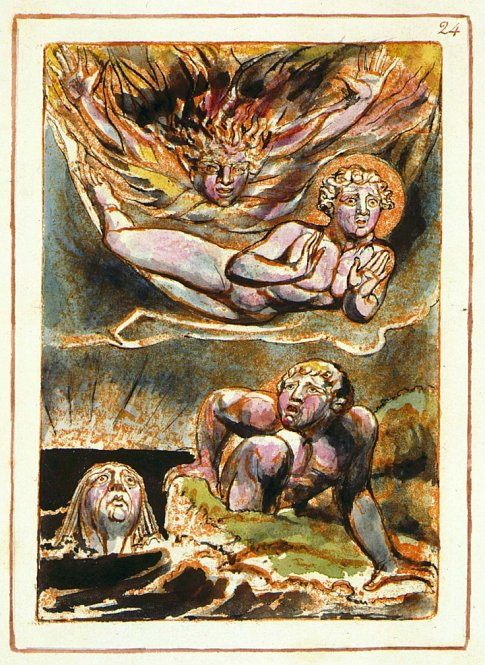
The birth of the four sons of Urizen, depicted in The Book of Urizen. Copy G, collection the Library of Congress. Thiriel appears in the center with a halo about his head

In the mythological writings of William Blake, Thiriel is the first son of Urizen. There is a possible confusion with Tiriel, the protagonist of the first prophetic book, of that name.

In The Book of Urizen, Thiriel has an explicit identification of his place as Air in the Four Elements, matched to Urizen's four sons. His birth is described in Chapter VIII:

Most Urizen sicken'd to see
His eternal creations appear,
Sons and daughters of sorrow, on mountains,
Weeping, wailing. First Thiriel appear'd,
Astonish'd at his own existence,
Like a man from a cloud born

Thiriel appears also in The Four Zoas, where he becomes Palamabron. At the end of the Seventh Night, we read:

Urizen became Rintrah Thiriel became Palamabron
