= Bromion =

Character in the mythology of William Blake

Bromion is a character in the mythology of William Blake. According to S. Foster Damon (A Blake Dictionary) he represents Reason, from the side of the poet's mind.

== Incidence ==
- Visions of the Daughters of Albion, in which he plays a major role
- Milton
- Jerusalem
- Vala, or The Four Zoas

== Relationships ==
In Vala, or the Four Zoas he is one of a quartet of four sons, with Rintrah, Palamabron, and Theotormon, whose parents are Los and Enitharmon (or alternatively, sons of Jerusalem).

He is a major character in Visions of the Daughters of Albion. He rapes Oothoon, and then is bound to her, back to back.
