= Utha =

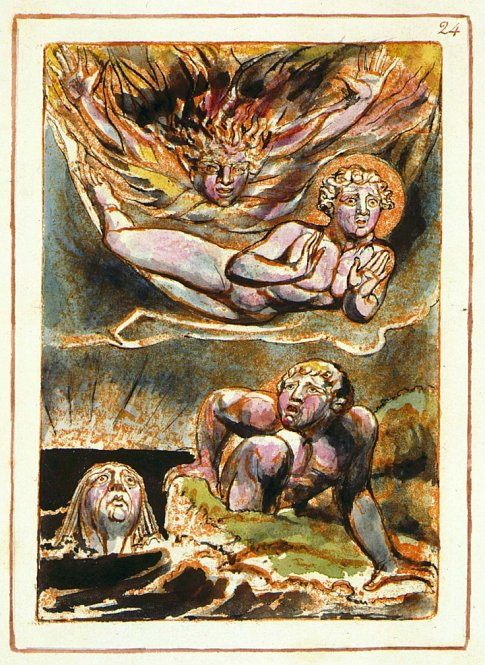
The birth of the four sons of Urizen. Copy G, collection the Library of Congress. Utha emerges from the water in the bottom left

In the mythological writings of William Blake, Utha is the second son of Urizen.

In Chapter VIII of The Book of Urizen, Utha's birth is briefly described:

[...] Utha,
From the waters emerging laments;

His identification is with the classical element Water, in the identification of Urizen's four sons.
