= Palamabron =

Figure in William Blake's mythology

Palamabron is a character in William Blake's mythology, representing pity. He is the second son of Enitharmon and Los, and the brother of Rintrah, Bromion, and Theotormon. In particular, he often appears as a counterpart to Rintrah - whereas Rintrah represents anger against oppression, Palambron represents sympathy with the oppressed. In Milton, he plays the role of Blake himself in his conflict with Satan.
