= Grodna (Blake) =

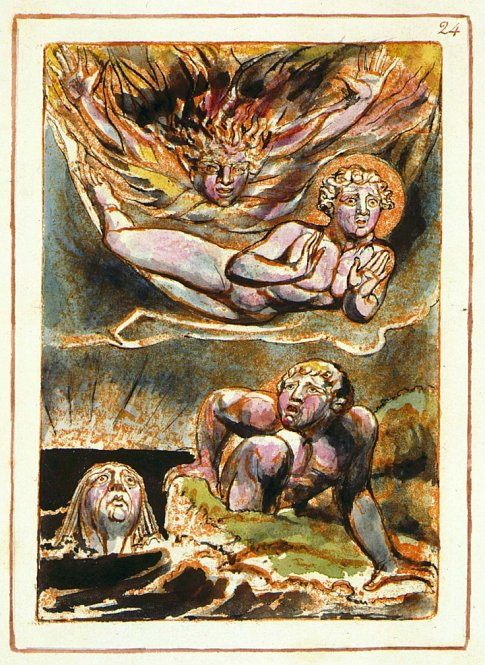
The birth of the four sons of Urizen, depicted in The Book of Urizen, copy G, collection the Library of Congress. Grodna appears in the bottom right

In the mythological writings of William Blake, Grodna is the third son of Urizen.

In Chapter VIII of The Book of Urizen his birth is described:

Grodna rent the deep earth, howling
Amaz'd; his heavens immense cracks
Like the ground parched with heat,[...]

His identification is with the classical element Earth, in the alignment of Urizen's four sons.
