= Urizen =

Embodiment of reason and law in the mythology of William Blake

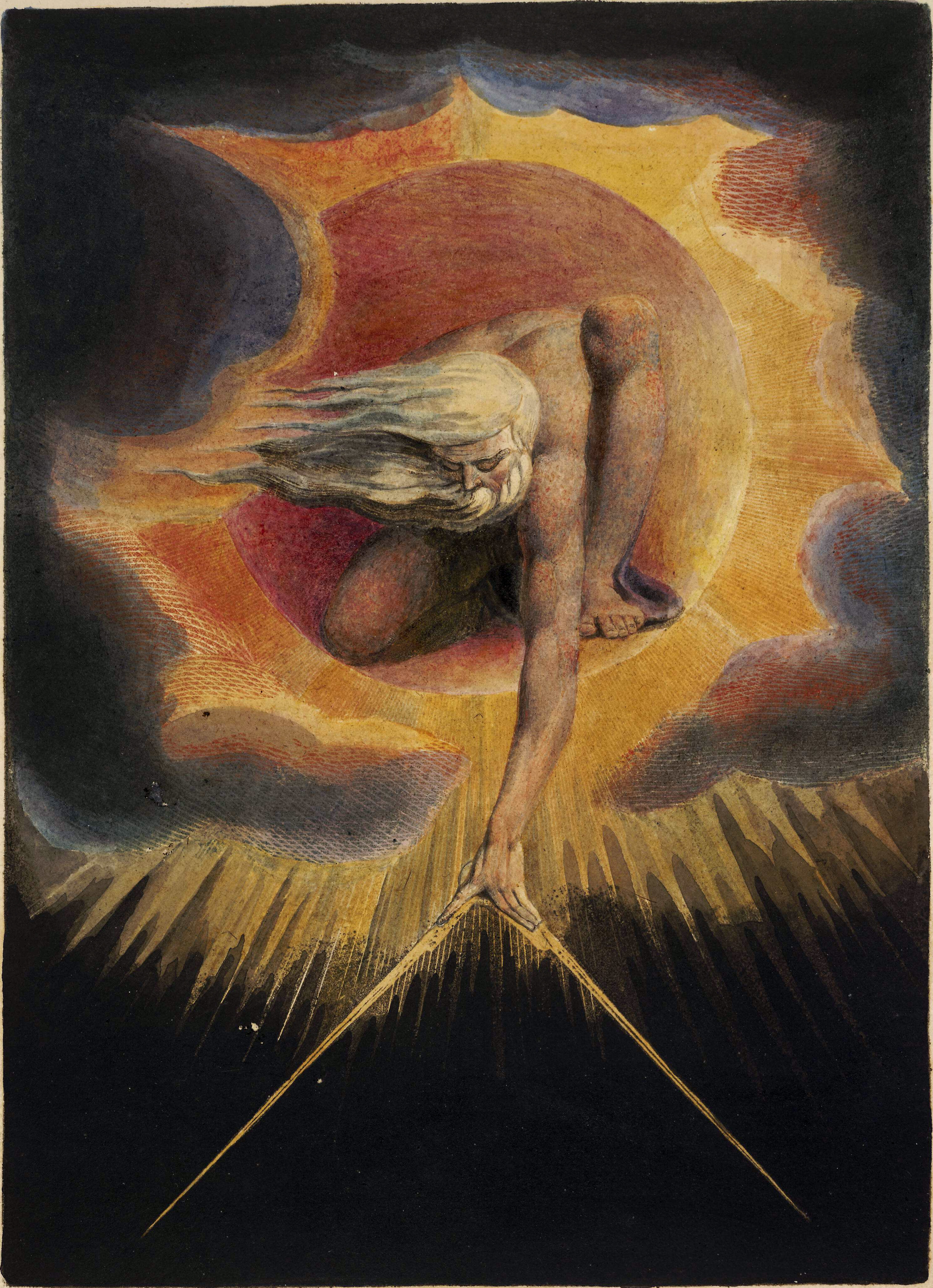
Blake's watercoloured etching The Ancient of Days

In the mythology of William Blake, Urizen (/ˈjʊrɪzən/) is the embodiment of conventional reason and law. He is usually depicted as a bearded old man; he sometimes bears architect's tools, to create and constrain the universe; or nets, with which he ensnares people in webs of law and conventional society. Originally, Urizen represented one half of a two-part system, with him representing reason and Los, his opposition, representing imagination. In Blake's reworking of his mythic system, Urizen is one of the four Zoas that result from the division of the primordial man, Albion, and he continues to represent reason. He has an Emanation, or paired female equivalent, Ahania, who stands for Pleasure. In Blake's myth, Urizen is joined by many daughters with three representing aspects of the body. He is also joined by many sons, with four representing the four elements. These sons join in rebellion against their father but are later united in the Last Judgment. In many of Blake's books, Urizen is seen with four books that represent the various laws that he places upon humanity.

== Character ==
In Blake's original myth, Urizen, the representation of abstractions and an abstraction of the human self, is the first entity. He believes himself holy and he sets about establishing various sins in a book of brass that serves as a combination of various laws as discovered by Newton, given to Moses, and the general concept of deism, which force uniformity upon mankind. The rest of the Eternals in turn become indignant at Urizen turning against eternity, and they instill these essences of sin within Urizen's creation. This torments Urizen, and Los soon after appears. Los's duty within the work is to watch over Urizen and serve as his opposition.

In terms of Blake's Orc cycle, Urizen serves as a Satanic force similar to Milton's Satan. After Urizen defeats the serpent/Orc figure in the Garden of Eden story, the Orc figure, in the form of Urizen's son Fuzon, battles against him in a story based on Exodus. Urizen, as a pillar of cloud that hinders the Israelites in their journey home, battles against Fuzon, as a pillar of fire that guides them by night. Eventually, Urizen is able to destroy his rebellious son and impose laws upon the Israelites in the form of the Ten Commandments. This also leads to a death of the Israelite society, and the Israelites under Urizen are imprisoned in a similar manner to how they were under the Egyptians. Symbolically, the Orc cycle describes how Urizen and Orc are part of one unified whole, with Urizen representing the destructive and older essence while Orc is the young and creative essence.

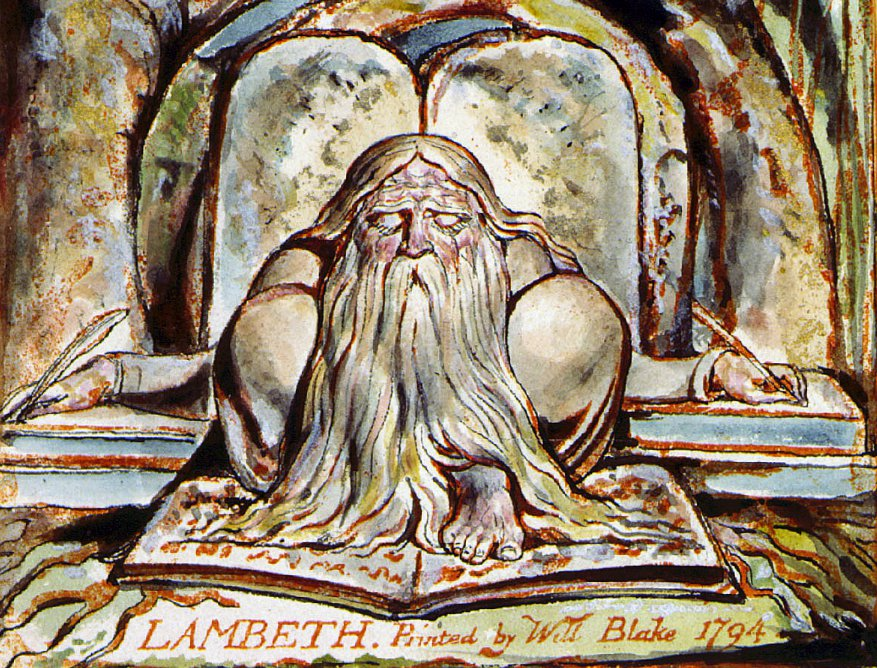
Urizen from the front page of Copy G (c. 1818) of The Book of Urizen currently held by the Library of Congress (detail)

In Blake's later myth, Urizen is one of the four Zoas, the fourfold division of the central god. The other three represent aspects of the trinity and he represents the fallen, Satanic figure although he is also the creator figure. Among the Zoas, he represents the south and the concept of reason. He is described as what binds and controls the universe through creating laws. He is connected to his Emanation known as Ahania, the representation of pleasure, and he is opposed to the Zoa named Urthona, the representation of Imagination. His name can mean many things, from "Your Reason" or a Greek word meaning "to limit". Urizen originates in the beginning of Blake's version of Genesis. He was the entity created when a voice said that light should be born, and he was the fourth child of the characters Albion and Vala. He is said to represent the Heavenly host, but he experiences a Satanic fall in that he desired to rule. He is motivated by his pride and becomes a hypocrite. When Albion asks for him, Urizen refuses and hides, which causes him to experience his fall. After his fall, Urizen set about creating the material world and his jealousy of mankind brought forth both Wrath and Justice.

In the material world, he had Steeds and a Chariot of Day that were stolen from him by Luvah. This occurred because he, reason, sought to take over the Northern lands of Luvah, Imagination. After setting to take over Imagination, Luvah's stealing of the horses, which represented instruction, showed how emotion could dominate over reason. After Luvah falls and becomes Orc, Urizen tries to regain his horses but can only witness them bound. Eventually, the horses are returned to him after the Final Judgment.

Within the early works, Urizen represents the chains of reason that are imposed on the mind. Urizen, like mankind, is bound by these chains. Additionally, these works describe how Newtonian reason and the enlightenment view of the universe traps the imagination. The poems emphasize an evolutionary development within the universe, and this early version of a "survival of the fittest" universe is connected to a fallen world of tyranny and murder.

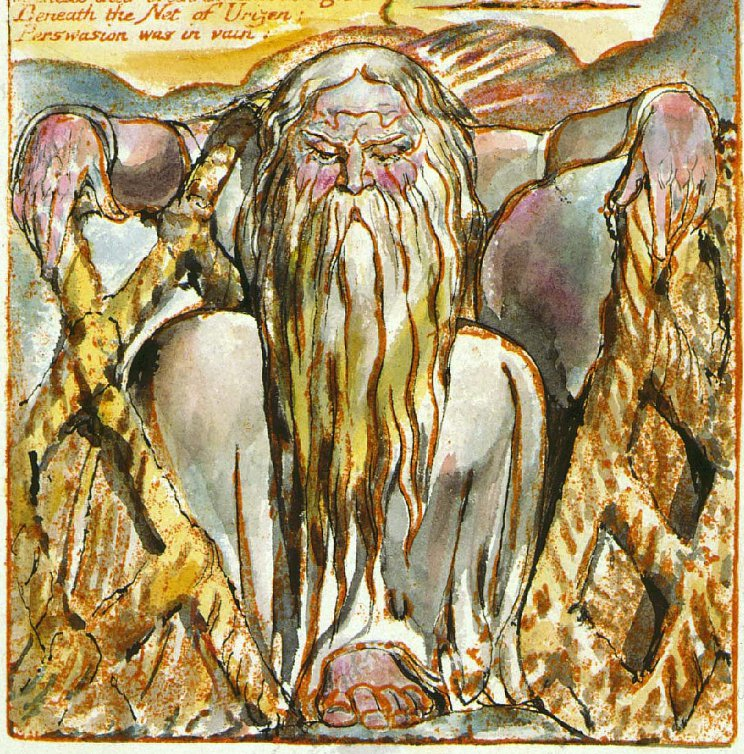
Urizen with his net – The Book of Urizen, copy G, object 27 c.1818 (detail)

Urizen's daughters started as the children of light and are possible images of either the planets or of the stars. After his fall, they gain human form. Three of his daughters are Eleth, Uveth and Ona, which represent the three parts of the human body. Together, they also organize the waters of Generation, they are the creators of the Bread of Sorrow, and read from the Book of Iron. At the Last Judgment, they watch over Ahania. His sons are differently organised, in different poems: as Thiriel, Utha, Grodna, Fuzon, aligned with the four classical elements; or as twelve, aligned with the signs of the Zodiac, and builders of the Mundane Shell and seek to keep mankind from falling. In Blake's early myths, they dwell in various cities and do not abide by Urizen's laws; Fuzon directly rebels against Urizen, is able to cut Urizen's loins, and is crucified for his actions. In later versions of the children, they are wise and dwell with Urizen. They, with Urizen, fall after Luvah takes over Urizen's realm. After their fall, they are tortured in hell, and Urizen's creation of science is seen as his domination over them. However, the four sons are placed in charge of Urthona's armies and rebel against Urizen's rule. During the Last Judgment, the sons get rid of their weapons and celebrate Urizen's return to the plow, and they join together for the harvest.

Urizen is described as having multiple books: Gold, Silver, Iron, and Brass. They represent science, love, war, and sociology, which are four aspects of life. The books are filled with laws that seek to overcome the seven deadly sins. He constantly adds to the works, even when he faces his opposition in Orc, but the books are destroyed in the Last Judgment. The Book of Brass sets forth Urizen's social beliefs that seek to remove all pain and instill peace under one rule. The attempt to force love through law encouraged the Eternals to put forth the Seven Deadly Sins that Urizen hoped to prevent. The Book of Iron was lost in the Tree of Mystery, and represents how Urizen can create wars but cannot control them.

== Appearances ==
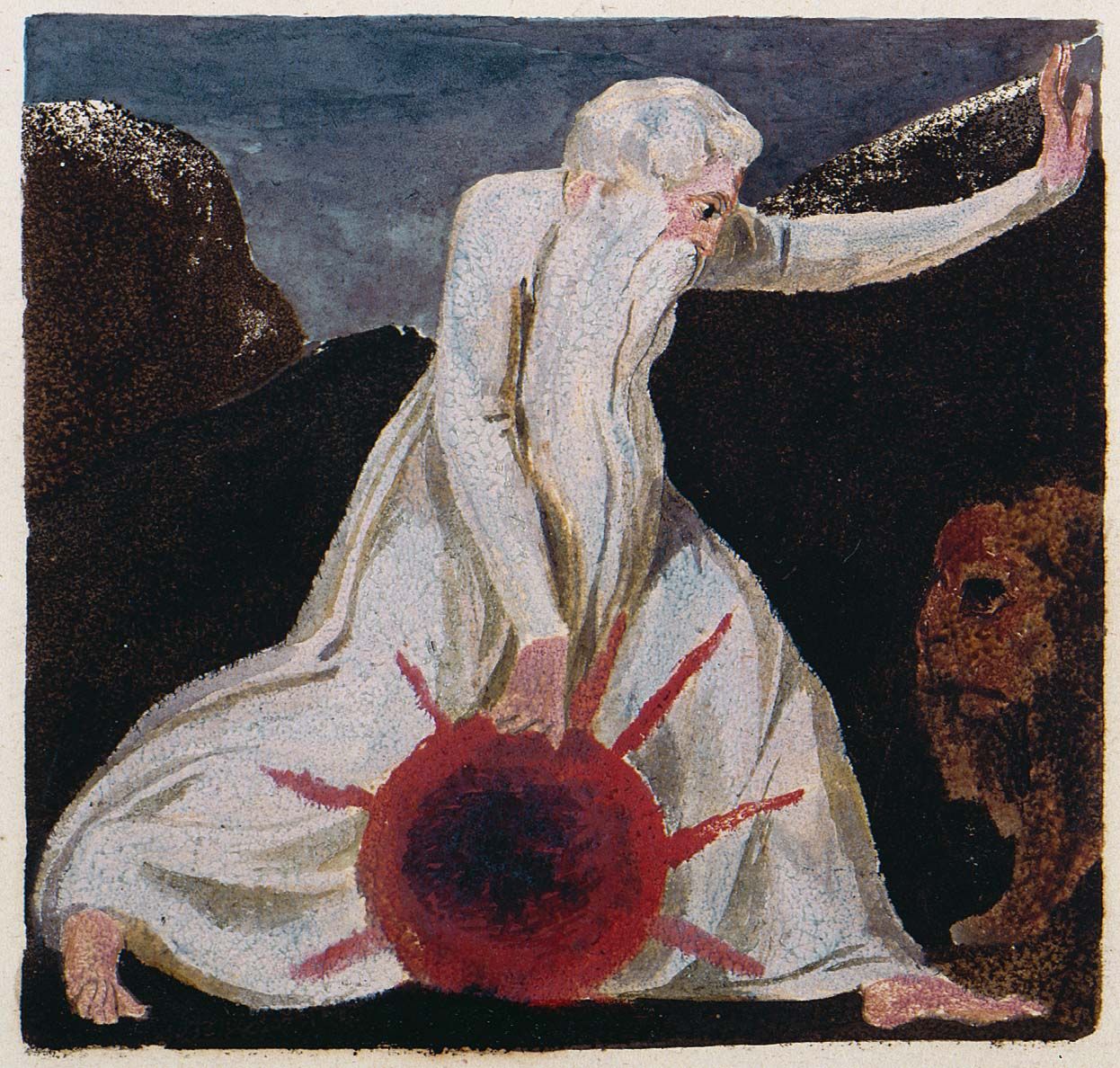
Urizen striding through a darkened space. The William Blake Archive identifies the image as describing "the episode in which "Urizen explor'd his dens / Mountain, moor, & wilderness, / With a globe of fire lighting his / journey" (The First Book of Urizen plate 22, Erdman page 81)." This illustration comes from Blake's "Small Book of Designs", one of his illuminated art books, that wasn't printed in mass (though some images are comparable to those in other works). This illustration is object 7 and plate 23 of "Small Book of Designs", which is currently held by the British Museum.

The character Urizen is first directly mentioned in Blake's "A Song of Liberty" (1793) where he is first described in his dispute with Orc. He is described as a "starry king". In To Nobodaddy, he is given the title "Father of Jealousy" and he is an enslaver. In America a Prophecy, he is the evil God who rules during the Enlightenment. The work also describes how Urizen created the world. This was followed by the Songs of Experience (1794) where he appears as the creator of the Tyger and in many of the poems: "Earth's Answer", "The Tyger", "The Human Abstract" and "A Divine Image". He is mentioned later that year in Europe a Prophecy and it is in the work that Urizen is freed from his bounds and he opens the Book of Brass in response to the American revolution.

In the Book of Urizen, Urizen is an eternal self-focused being that creates itself out of eternity, and, it is only Urizen, the representation of abstractions and an abstraction of the human self, that exists in the beginning. Eventually, he creates the rest of creation but is tormented from the rest of the Eternal essence. Urizen is seen as the essence of the eternal priest and is opposed by Los, the eternal prophet. Parts of the story were later revised in The Book of Los and The Book of Ahania: The Book of Ahania describes Urizen's relationship with his son Fuzon, and the Book of Los (1795) describes Urizen's creations from Los's viewpoint. The Song of Los (1795) describes how Urizen's laws are given to humanity and their destructive effects. The work ends with Orc's appearance and Urizen weeping.

Urizen appears within Blake's illustrations of Job as an image of Apollo. He and his realm are described in Blake's Milton a Poem, and he is said to have a throne of silver/love. His realm included his children and was surrounded by justice and eternal science. The work also describes Urizen's Satanic fall. The Urizen of Milton is in the form of reason, and it is he that Milton follows. He appears again in the image "Milton's Dream" as illustrated for Il Penseroso. In the image, Urizen is with images of despair and is interfering with the image of the true God.

In Vala, or The Four Zoas, Urizen was said to have been born as the son of Albion and Vala, and is the fourth son. He was made the leader of Heaven's host and commanded the material sun. The work also describes his fall. Urizen appears in Jerusalem The Emanation of the Giant Albion in a form similar to the previous works. Urizen is the organiser of the universe while Los is the forger. He creates Natural Religion, and, in his returned form after Albion awakes, he is a farmer.

== Derivation ==
Urizen has clear similarities with the creature called the Demiurge by Gnostic sects, who is likewise largely derived of the Old Testament god (more specifically, like Blake's Urizen, the demiurge is a radical remodelling of that figure achieved by expanding that figure's original contextual setting, or by removing him to one that is almost completely new). Speculative Freemasonry is another possible source of Blake's imagery for Urizen; Blake was attracted to the Masonic and Druidic speculations of William Stukeley. The compass and other drafting symbols that Blake associates with Urizen borrow from Masonic symbolism for God as the "Great Architect of the Universe".
