= The Book of Ahania =

1795 poetry book by William Blake

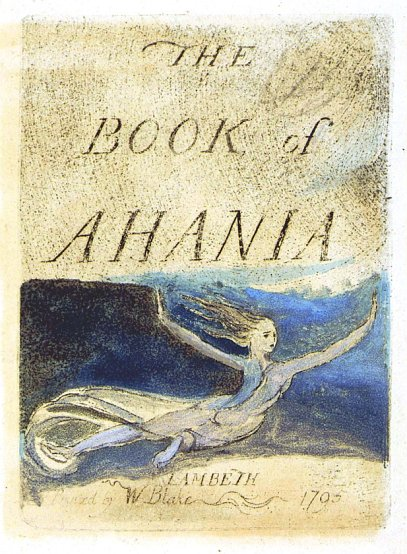
- Title page from the Book of Ahania
- Author: William Blake
- Publication date: 1795
- Publication place: England
- Preceded by: The Book of Los

The Book of Ahania is one of the English poet William Blake's prophetic books. It was published in 1795, illustrated by Blake's own plates.

The poem of the book consists of six chapters. The content concerns Fuzon, a son of Urizen, a Zoa or major aspect in Blake's mythology. Ahania of the title is Urizen's female counterpart.

== Background ==
During autumn 1790, Blake moved to Lambeth, Surrey. He had a studio at the new house that he used while writing his what were later called his "Lambeth Books", which included The Book of Ahania in 1795. Like the others under the title, all aspects of the work, including the composition of the designs, the printing of them, the colouring of them, and the selling of them, happened at his home. The Book of Ahania was one of the few works that Blake describes as "illuminated printing", one of his colour printed works with the coloured ink being placed on the copperplate before printed.

Both The Book of Los and The Book of Ahania were the same size, produced at the same time, and were probably etched on opposing sides of the same copper-plates. Both works were the only ones by Blake to have intaglio etchings instead of relief etchings. Likewise, both works were colour-printed, where the various coloured inks were directly applied to the etching instead of added in later.

Although separate copies of individual plates exist, only one complete version of the Ahania exists, which is in the collection of the Library of Congress.

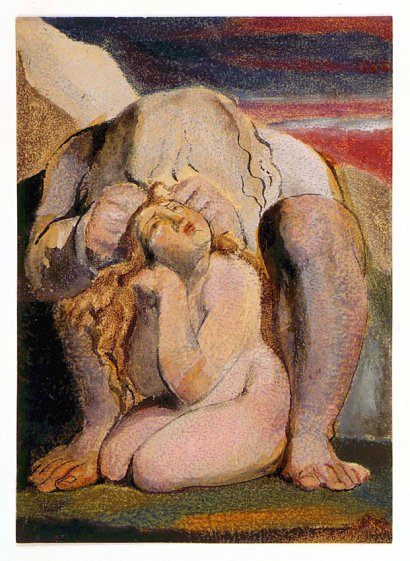
Frontispiece to Ahania, showing Urizen destroying his emanation Ahania

== Poem ==
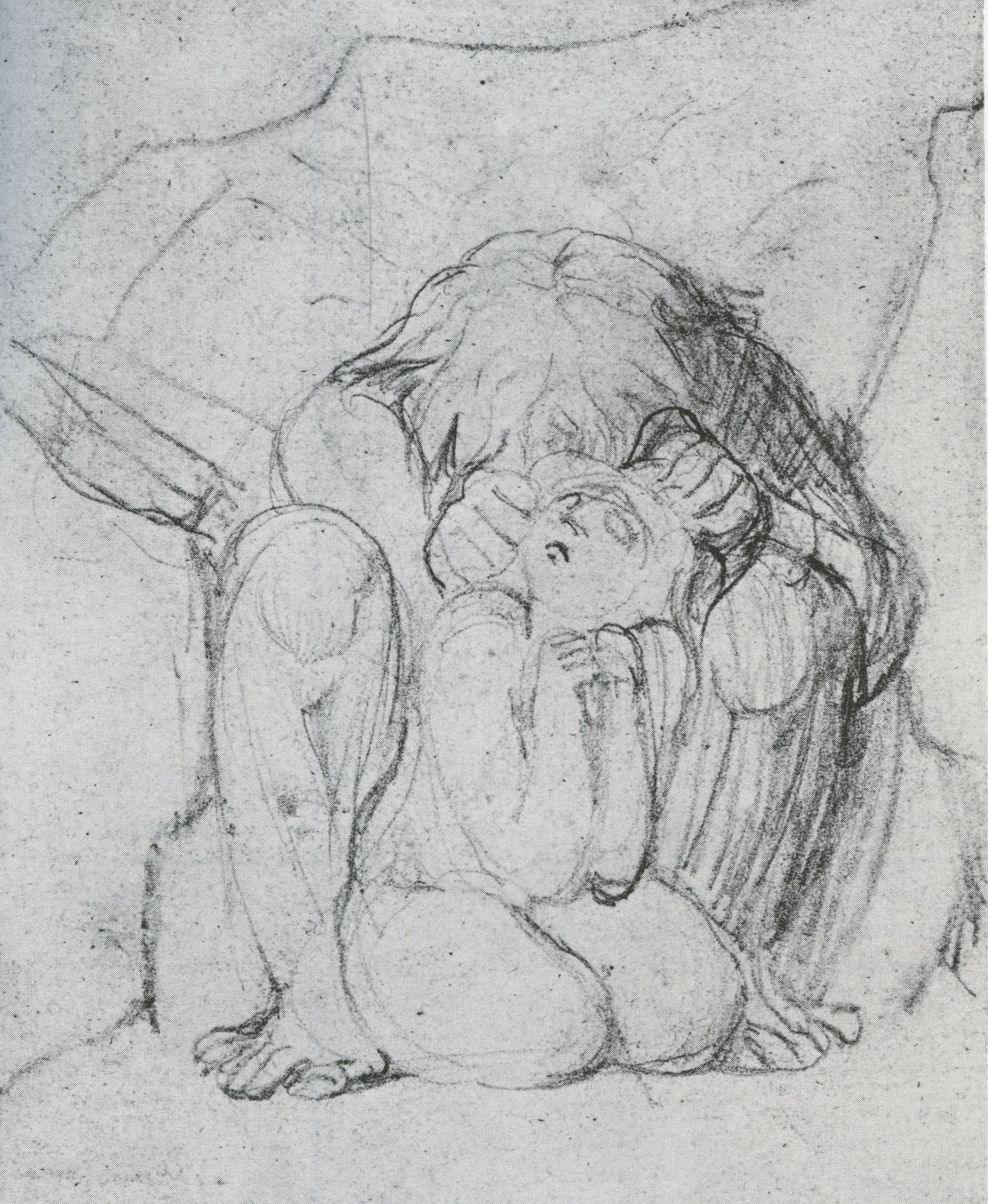
Blake's pencil sketch for the above plate. Note that the image is reversed by the printing process

The story begins with Fuzon rebelling against Urizen, his father:

"Shall we worship this Demon of Smoke,"
Said Fuzon, "This abstract non-entity
This cloudy God seated on Waters
Now seen, now obscur'd; King of sorrow?"

— Lines 10–13

After the verbal attack, Fuzon attacks Urizen with fire and declares himself God. This leads to the creation of the tree of mystery by Urizen by accident followed by the nailing of Fuzon's body to it:

Amaz'd started Urizen! when
He beheld himself compassed round
And high roofed over with trees
He arose but the stems stood so thick
He with difficulty and great pain
Brought his Books, all but the Book
Of iron, from the dismal shade

— Lines 116–122

The poem continues with Ahania lamenting her disconnection from Urizen:

Cruel jealousy! selfish fear!
Self-destroying: how can delight
Renew in these chains of darkness

— Lines 233–235

== Themes ==
The Book of Ahania, along with The Book of Los, serves as an experimental revision of The Book of Urizen, and the poem takes its name from the Emanation of Urizen that he discarded. The end of The Book of Urizen describes the end of the African civilization, which is the third of seven cycles and describes the Garden of Eden story. The book closes with Orc being cursed as the serpent, and The Book of Ahania discusses the next cycle happening within Asia. The work parallels Exodus, and it describes how the Orc figure and the Urizen figure struggle for dominance over the Israelites. The Orc figure is connected to the pillar of fire that is seen at night and Urizen is the pillar of cloud during the day that, in Blake, confuses them. However, Urizen is able to finally defeat Orc when the Israelites accept the ten commandments. This leads to a death of the Israeli culture symbolised by the serpent on Moses's pole, which is also symbol of Orc's death. This is finalised with the Israelites returning from their revolution against Egypt to a state that is exactly like that under Egypt.

The story of Orc and Urizen is an allegorical tale in which the young destroy the old, with Urizen representing the sterile, old figure that can only destroy and not create. However, in The Book of Ahania, Urizen is able to have a son, Fuzon, which is the embodiment of fire and an Orc figure. This connects the Orc and Urizen figures. Fuzon/Orc is also connected to many Biblical and Classical individuals, including Esau, the rival of Jacob who was forced to wander the desert. Another individual is David's son Absalom who rebelled against the traditional Jewish theological system. He was stabbed with a spear and hanged by his hair. Other individuals include Samson, Baldar, Odin, and Jesus. As a whole, The Book of Ahania describes themes and ideas that are later brought up again in The Four Zoas.

Ahania, the manifestation of intellectual desire, is sexual in a fallen state and dismissed by Urizen as sinful. However, as picked up in the later work, Ahania is necessary for a divine wisdom to be attained. The work also portrays Ahania as a solitary individual that spends her time lamenting. In regards to the story, her lament is in response to the fighting between Urizen and Fuzon, which is similar to the grieving widow, Lorma, within the Ossian poems. This is taken up once again in Europe a Prophecy.

The Book of Ahania was the first work of Blake's to mention his Tree of Mystery. The Tree symbolically connects Christianity with Druidic belief, and makes the argument that Christianity is a continuation of previous customs. The image is also connected to Edmund Burke's describing of the English nation as connected to the English oak. Those, like Blake, that were revolutionary minded believed that the tree should be cut down and a Tree of Liberty should replace it. The Druidic imagery was also continued in the work in the image of human sacrifice through the form of the crucifixion which comes when Urizen nails the dead Fuzon to the Tree of Mystery. In this aspect, the tree is similar to the tree that was sacred to Odin and grew throughout the universe. Blake uses this pagan connection to undermine the authority of Christianity, which was likewise done by those like Thomas Paine, other radicals. The tree as image attacking both traditional government and orthodox Christianity is used by many radicals.

== General references ==
- Bentley, G. E. Jr. The Stranger from Paradise. New Haven: Yale University Press, 2003.
- Bloom, Harold. The Visionary Company. Ithaca: Cornell University Press, 1993.
- Damon, S. Foster. A Blake Dictionary. Hanover: University Press of New England, 1988.
- Frye, Northrop. Fearful Symmetry. Princeton: Princeton University Press, 1990.
- Mee, Jon. Dangerous Enthusiasm. Oxford: Clarendon, 2002.
