= Thel (opera) =

- Chamber opera by Dmitri Smirnov
- Scene 3: The Clod leads Thel to see the places of the dead
- Native title: Russian: Тэль
- Librettist: Smirnov
- Language: English, translated to Russian
- Based on: William Blake's "The Book of Thel"
- Premiere: 9 June 1989; Almeida Theatre, London

Thel or The Lamentations of Thel (Russian: Тэль or Жалобы Тэли – Zhaloby Teli) is a chamber opera in four scenes with a prologue by the Russian composer Dmitri N. Smirnov to his own libretto in English after William Blake. It was composed in 1985–1986, and was also translated to Russian.

== Subject and creation history ==
The opera was composed during 1985-1986 in Moscow and Ruza. It is a sequel to another opera based on Blake, Tiriel (1985). The libretto is based on the very early poem by Blake, "The Book of Thel" (1789), in which he presented part of his immense mythology. Thel, so-called from the Greek word meaning "desire" or "will", is young girl complaining on her future death. There are points of dialogue between two works. And they are interconnected through the common idea of search for a meaning to life, through the place where the action is set, the Valleys of Har – a creation of Blake’s imagination – and also through the similarity of the music material. In the first instance, however, we are dealing with a dramatic tragedy, an illustration of the forces of evil, which brings death and destruction to the world, whereas in the second we have an intimate and lyrical parable-pastoral.

== Performance history ==
World premiere: 9 June 1989, Almeida Theatre, London.

- Director: Annabel Arden
- Designer: Willow Winston
- Soprano: Jane W Davidson
- Contralto: Lore Lixemberg
- Countertenor: Andrew Watts
- Conductor: Jeremy Arden
- Company: Théâtre de Complicité

Second staging: 29 May 1993, Ballroom Student’s Union, Keele University, Staffordshire.

- Director and soprano: Jane Davidson;
- Conductor: Rahmil Fishman

== Roles ==
- Thel – soprano
- Clod of Clay – contralto
- Lily of the Valley – Boy or girl soprano
- Cloud – countertenor (or soprano)
- Worm – Mime
- Ghosts – Mixed chamber choir (SATB)

Time and Place: The Vales of Har, the Places of the Dead
Duration: 52 minutes

== Synopsis ==
Scene I. The daughters of Mne Seraphim are all shepherdesses in the Vales of Har, apart from the youngest, Thel. She spends her time wandering on her own, trying to find the answer to the question that torments her: why does the springtime of life inevitably fade so that all things must end? She meets the Lily of the Valley who tries to comfort her. When Thel remains uncomforted, the Lily sends her on to ask the Cloud.

Scene II. The Cloud explains that he is part of a natural process and, although he sometimes disappears, he is never gone forever. Thel replies that she is not like the Cloud and when she disappears she will not return. So the Cloud suggests asking the same question of the Worm.

Scene III. The Worm is still a child and cannot answer. Instead it is the Worm’s mother, the Clod of Clay, who answers. The Clod explains that we do not live for ourselves, but for others. She invites Thel to enter into her underground realm and see the places of the dead where Thel herself will one day reside.

Scene IV. Once there, at the places of the dead, however, Thel is assailed by mysterious voices asking a whole series of yet more terrible questions of existence. Uttering a shriek, she flees back to her home in the Vales of Har.

== Scoring ==
- Singers: soprano, boy (or girl) soprano, countertenor, contralto, mime artist, mixed chamber choir
- Orchestra: flute (piccolo), oboe, clarinet, bassoon, French horn, trumpet, trombone, 2 percussion players (timpani, jingle bells, triangle, suspended cymbal, gong, bass drum, tam-tam, glockenspiel, tubular bells, xylophone, vibraphone) celesta, harp, 2 violins, viola, violoncello, double bass.

== Publishers ==
- Boosey & Hawkes, London (for the UK, British Commonwealth (excluding Canada) and the Republic of Ireland)
- Internationale Musikverlage Hans Sikorski, Hamburg.

== Quotations ==
- "The simple opposition between Tiriel, an enraged and exhausted old man, and Thel, a child from the Songs of Innocence has allowed Smirnov to create a pair of works quite different but complementary" (Gerard McBurney)
