= Thel =

Thel or THEL may refer to any of the following:

- Thel, main character of The Book of Thel, by William Blake
- Thel (opera), by Dmitri N. Smirnov, based on Blake's work
- THEL, acronym for the Tactical High Energy Laser
- Thel, Rhône, a former commune in the Rhône department in eastern France
- Thel 'Vadam, the name of the current Arbiter from the Halo franchise.
