= Tiriel (opera) =

Opera by Dmitri Smirnov

- Opera by Dmitri Smirnov
- Native title: Russian: Тириэль
- Librettist: Smirnov
- Language: English, translated to Russian and German
- Based on: Poem by William Blake
- Premiere: 28 January 1989; Theater Freiburg

Tiriel, Op. 41, (Russian: Тириэль) is a 1985 opera by the Russian composer Dmitri Smirnov in three acts (9 scenes) with a symphonic prologue to his own English libretto after a poem of the same title by William Blake. It has been translated into Russian and German. It was first performed at the Stadttheater Freiburg on 28 January 1989.

== Creation history ==
The opera was composed from 1983 until 1985 in Moscow, Russia. The libretto combines the text from Blake's early symbolic work "Tiriel" (c. 1789) with the addition of five of his poems: the "Introduction" and "The Divine Image" from the Songs of Innocence (1789), "The Tyger" and "A Divine Image" from the Songs of Experience (1789-1794), and "A Cradle Song" from his Note-book (Manuscript Rossetti, 1793).

== Performance history ==
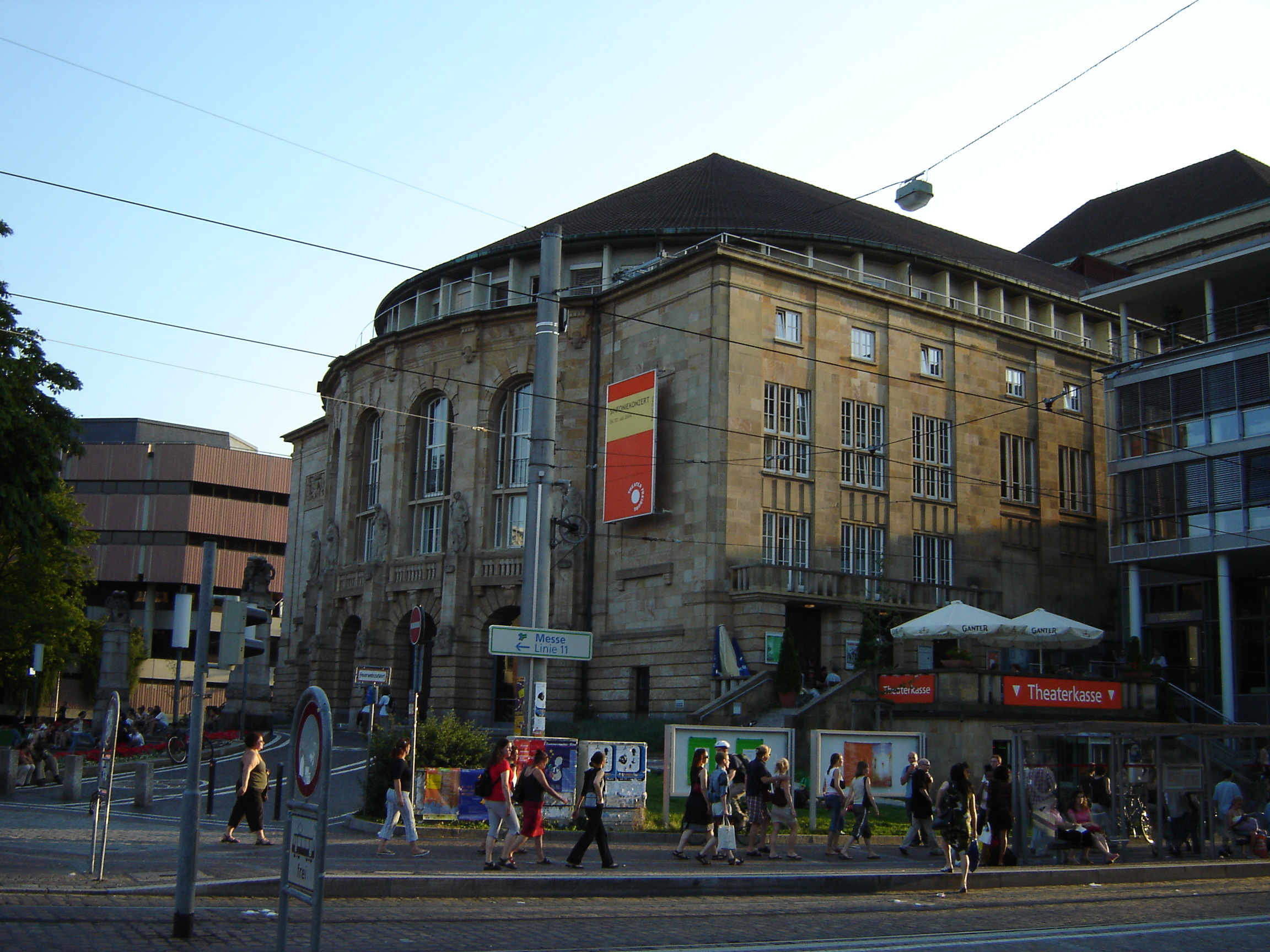
Stadttheater Freiburg

The premiere took place at the Stadttheater Freiburg on 28 January 1989.

- German translation: Paul Esterházy
- Stage director: Siegfried Schoenbohm
- Decorations: Brigitte Friesz
- Costumes: Renate Schmitzer
- Choreography: Krisztina Horvath
- Conductor: Gerchard Markson

== Roles ==
- Tiriel, the old and blind king – baritone: Rudolf Kostas
- Har, his father – tenor: George Maran
- Heva, his mother – soprano: Melinda Liebermann
- Ijim, his brother – tenor: Grant Wollaber
- Zazel, his brother – bass: Jasse Ciston/Friedemann Kunder
- Hela, his daughter – soprano: Annette Robbert
- Mnetha, nurse of Har and Heva – contralto: Kathrin Asman
- Myratana, Tiriel's wife – silent role: Elke Buerger
- Nightingale – dancer: Antoinette Laurent
- Tiger – dancer: Mauno Hyvaerinen
- Tiriel's sons (and daughter) – male chorus (or mixed chorus)
- Zasel's sons – male chorus
- Birds and flowers – dancers

Time and Place: at the dawn of time

Duration 113 minutes.

== Synopsis ==
The blind and aged king, Tiriel, calls down curses on his sons whom he has summoned to observe their mother's death. The sons bury their mother, but declare that they have tired of their father's tyranny and now will rebel against it. So Tiriel sets off wandering into the mountains.

Eventually he comes to the ‘pleasant gardens' in the Vales of Har, where he finds his own parents, Har and Heva, who are both quite senile and have become like children again. They invite Tiriel to help them catch birds and listen to Har's singing in the "great cage". In madness and dismay, Tiriel abandons them and sets out further on his wanderings.

Tiriel's wild brother Ijim finds him, captures him and takes him back to his children who are living in what once was his own palace. Tiriel, ever madder and more enraged, curses his children yet more passionately, calling down thunder and pestilence and destroying them. Doing so, he sends his favourite daughter Hela mad. Nonetheless it is Hela who must guide Tiriel back to his parents in the Vales of Har.

On the way through the mountains they pass caves which are the home of another of Tiriel's brothers, Zazel. Zazel, together with his sons, hurls dirt and stones at Tiriel and his daughter. Eventually Tiriel and Hela arrive once more at the tent in the Vales of Har, where Har and Heva live. In a final speech, Tiriel explains how his father's laws and his own wisdom now "end together in a curse". Cursing his parents, he dies. Over Tiriel's body the goddess Mnetha sings a lullaby to the mankind who sleeps forever.

== Quotations ==
"It is important when presenting works like Tiriel in the West not to apologize for what might seem to be naïve. Russians feel the way they do because they want to, not because they can't do anything else. In this respect, the Freiburgers' musical performance struck me as exemplary..." (Gerard McBurney)

== Scoring ==
- Singers and actors: 7 singers; male chorus; actress; dancers;
- Orchestra: 3 flutes, 3 oboes, 3 clarinets, 2 saxophones, 3 bassoons, 4 French horns, 3 trumpets, 3 trombones, tuba, 4 to 5 percussion players (5 timpani, triangle, sonagli, cymbals, 3 gongs, claves, 3 temple blocks, 2 wood blocks, 2 bongos, 5 tom-toms, tambourin, side drum, guiro, bambusi, lion's roar, cassa rulante, bass drum, tam-tam, crotales, flexatone, tubular bells, glockenspiel, xylophone, vibraphone), celesta, harp, and strings.

== Publishers ==
Boosey & Hawkes, London, and Internationale Musikverlage Hans Sikorski, Hamburg
