= Hela (Blake) =

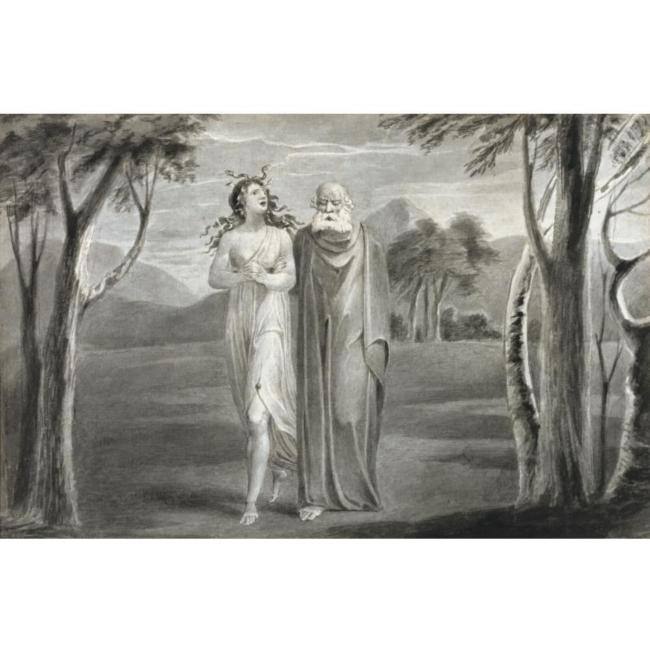
Tiriel led by Hela (Private Collection); the illustrated text is "All night they wanderd thro the wood & when the sun arose/They entered on the mountains of Har" (7:18-19). Note the snakes in Hela's hair.

In the mythological writings of William Blake, Hela is the youngest of the five daughters of Tiriel. She is the only survivor of his curse. She denounces her blind father for what he has done; he curses her once more, turning her hair to Medusa-style snakes. She guides him to the Vales of Har.
