= Walter Felsenstein =

Austrian theater and opera director

Walter Felsenstein.

Walter Felsenstein (30 May 1901 – 8 October 1975) was an Austrian theater and opera director.

He was one of the most important exponents of textual accuracy, productions in which dramatic and musical values were exquisitely researched and balanced. His most famous students were Götz Friedrich and Harry Kupfer both of whom went on to have important careers developing Felsenstein's work. Opera director Siegfried Schoenbohm was one of his assistants.

== Biography ==
Felsenstein was born in Vienna and began his career at the Burgtheater there. From 1923 to 1932, he was a theater actor in Lübeck, Mannheim and Beuthen, where he first worked as a director. In Basel and Freiburg im Breisgau, he became closely acquainted with the contemporary concert hall.

From 1932 to 1934 he worked as an opera director in Cologne, and from 1934 to 1936 at the Oper Frankfurt. He worked in Zürich from 1938 to 1940 and returned in 1940 to Germany, where he was active at the Berlin Schillertheater until 1944. Additionally, he worked as a guest director in Aachen, Düsseldorf, Metz and Strassburg. In 1942 he produced Le nozze di Figaro at the Salzburg Festival, with Clemens Krauss conducting, and sets and costumes by Stefan Hlawa.

From 1945 to 1947 he worked at the Hebbel-Theater in Berlin. In 1947 he created the Komische Oper in East Berlin, where he worked as director until his death. From 1956 on he was vice-president of the Academy of Arts, Berlin of the German Democratic Republic. He was awarded the National Prize of DDR in 1950, 1951, 1956, 1960, and 1970.

Although his presence in the German Democratic Republic was "mostly an accident of geography," he was able to get the support of the government do his life's work.

Together with the Komische Oper troupe he visited the USSR a few times. In 1969 he directed the Russian language production of Carmen by Bizet at the Stanislavsky and Nemirovich-Danchenko Moscow Academic Music Theater in Moscow. In Moscow it was stated that his way of the opera staging was similar to the principles of Konstantin Stanislavsky.

Felsenstein died at age 74 in East Berlin. He is buried in Kloster on Hiddensee, an island in the Baltic Sea.

== Translations ==
He translated and edited numerous operatic works into German, including Carmen (Georges Bizet, 1949) and La traviata (Giuseppe Verdi, 1955). Famous productions include Die Zauberflöte (Mozart, 1954), Les contes d'Hoffmann (Jacques Offenbach, 1958), Otello (Verdi, 1959), Barbe-bleue (Offenbach, 1961), The Cunning Little Vixen (Leoš Janáček, 1956), and A Midsummer Night's Dream (Benjamin Britten). The foreign-language operas Felsenstein produced were not usually set in their original tongue, but in a German translation.
