= The Nightingale and the Rose (opera) =

Opera

A scene from the opera The Nightingale and the Rose by Elena Firsova

The Nightingale and the Rose (Russian: Соловей и роза – Solovey i roza) is a chamber opera in one act (five scenes) by Russian composer Elena Firsova (Op. 46, 1990–1991) written to her own English libretto after Oscar Wilde’s story of the same name together with poetry by Christina Rossetti.

== Creation and performance history ==
The opera was written at the request of Paul Esterházy, the director of the Ulm Theatre in Germany. Firsova created the libretto combining the text from Oscar Wilde's fairy-tale, taken from the collection The Happy Prince and Other Stories (1888), with four poems by Christina Rossetti. This was the last work the composer completed in the Soviet Union before she moved to England in 1991. However, the idea of the staging in Germany was abandoned when Paul Esterházy suddenly left the Ulm Theatre.

The opera was produced in London. It was premiered on July 8, 1994 (with subsequent performances on July 9, 16, 18 and 20) at the Almeida Theatre by Almeida Opera, with the singers Rachael Hallawell (mezzo-soprano), Philip Sheffield (tenor), and Carol Smith (soprano), designer Julian McGowan, stage director Caroline Gawn, and conductor David Parry.

== Publishers ==
Publishing rights:

- Boosey & Hawkes, London for UK, British Commonwealth (excluding Canada) and the Republic of Ireland.
- Internationale Musikverlage Hans Sikorski, Hamburg, for Germany, Denmark, Switzerland, Spain, Greece, Iceland, Israel, Netherlands, Portugal, Scandinavia, Turkey.

== Roles ==
- The Nightingale – (soprano)
- The Student – (tenor)
- The Girl – (mezzo-soprano)
- Green Lizard – mezzo-soprano (from chorus)
- Butterfly – tenor (from chorus)
- Daisy – bass (from chorus)
- White Rose Tree – chorus (2 sopranos, 2 altos)
- Yellow Rose Tree – chorus (2 tenors, 2 basses)
- Red Rose Tree – chorus (2 sopranos, 2 altos, 2 tenors, 2 basses)
- Oak Tree – bass with microphone (from chorus)

== Score ==
Flute (=piccolo), oboe, clarinet, bassoon, horn, trumpet, trombone, 3 percussion players (triangle, Indian jingles, whip, maracas, bamboo pipes, pagoda jingles, bass drum, suspended cymbals, bells, Chinese gong, Javanese gong, tamtam, glockenspiel, xylophone, vibraphone), harp, celesta, strings (1/1/1/1/1)

== Synopsis ==
- Scene 1. The Garden of the Student. The student is told by the girl he loves that she will dance with him all night if only he will bring her a red rose. But he cannot find a red rose in the garden. The nightingale hears his complaints and is so moved that she decides to find a red rose for him herself.
- Scene 2. Unfortunately the first two rose-trees she asks produce white and yellow roses. Only the third tree, which grows beneath the student's window, produces red roses. But this tree has been chilled by the winter frosts and the nightingale learns that she will only obtain her red-rose if she sings to it all night long, pressing her heart against one of its thorns and spilling her warm blood over its cold branches. She must give her life for this red rose.
- Scene 3. The student understands nothing of this. Hearing the nightingale's song in the garden, he thinks it something meaningless and of no practical use.
- Scene 4. So the nightingale, impaled on a thorn of the rose-tree, sings all night long beneath the student's window. And at dawn she dies and her body falls into the long grass.
- Scene 5. The student looks out and sees to his delight a red rose, which he immediately plucks and takes to the girl he loves. But the girl is quite unimpressed because she is quite the blind cow, declaring that the rose will not go with her dress and, anyway, she prefers the jewels given to her by the Chamberlain's nephew. So the student, disillusioned and impatient, hurls the red rose beneath the wheels of a passing carriage and returns to his books. The chorus - as the echo of the voice of the dead Nightingale - sings from off stage: “Remember me…”

== Review ==
The music of the opera was described by one critic as follows: "...her intricate chamber-score is so delicately, rapturously, expiringly romantic that we hearkened to it all without complaint." (David Murray, Financial Times on July 11, 1994).

== Music and sound samples ==
The opera culminates with the four songs of the Nightingale, settings of the four sonnets by Christina Rossetti (1830–1894):

- 1. Remember me, when I am gone away… read the poem (see the music example below)
- 2. Sleep, unforgotten sorrow, sleep awhile…
- 3. So tired am I, so weary of to-day…
- 4. Time flies, hope flags, life piles a wearied wing… see the Sonnet No.10

== Bibliography ==
- Russians in England by Yuri Kholopov, in 'Ex oriente...: Ten Composers from the Former USSR', Berlin: Verlag Ernst Kuhn, 2002, pp. 207–266 ISBN 3-928864-84-X
- Firsova, Yelena Olegovna by Stephen Johnson, in 'The New Grove Dictionary of Opera', ed. Stanley Sadie (London, 1992) ISBN 0-333-73432-7
