= Elena Firsova =

Russian composer

- Еле́на Фи́рсова
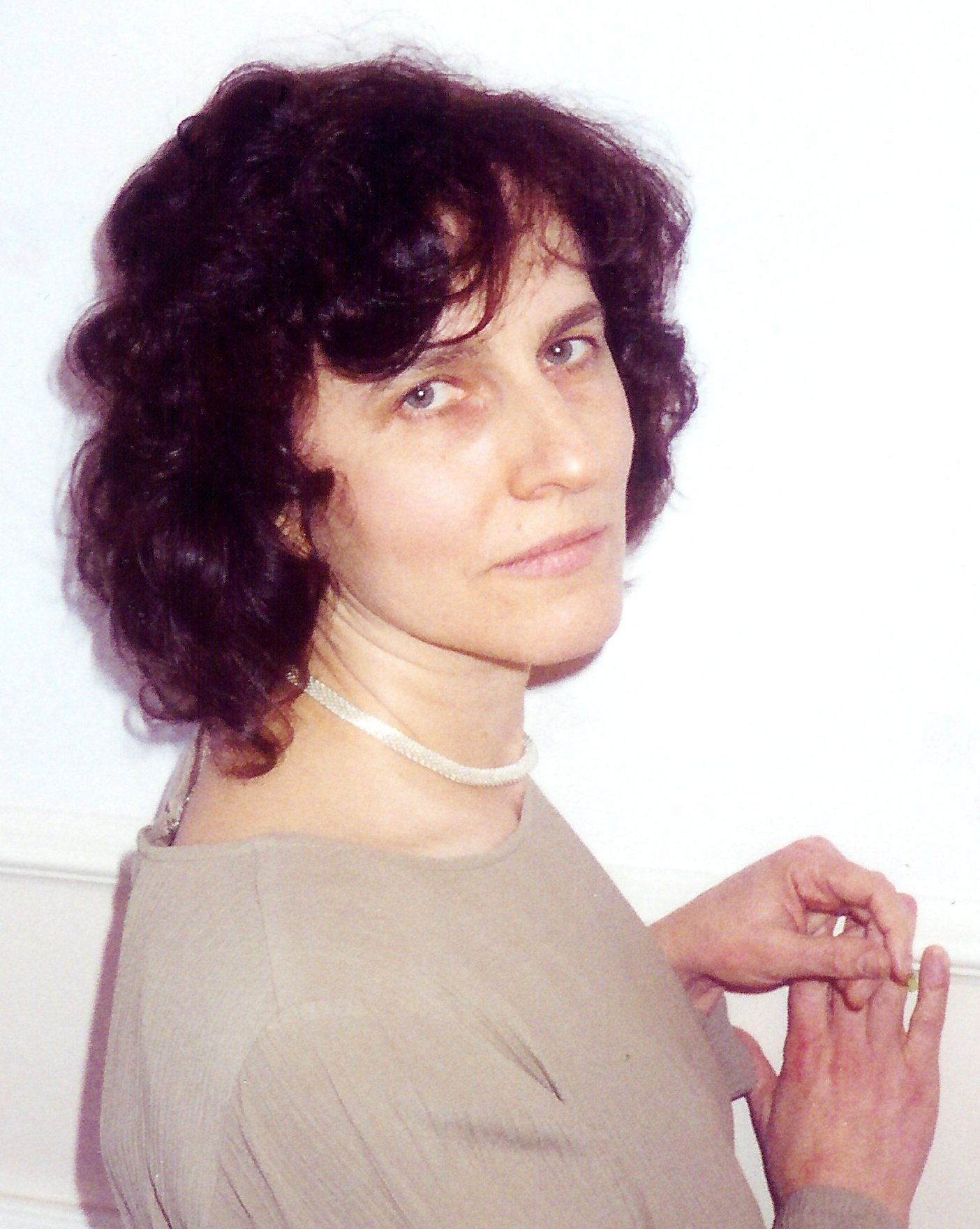
- Elena Firsova in 2003
- Born: Elena Olegovna Firsova; 21 March 1950; Leningrad, Russian SSR, Soviet Union
- Occupation: Composer
- Spouse: Dmitri Smirnov (m. 1972; died 2020)
- Children: 2

Elena Olegovna Firsova (Russian: Еле́на Оле́говна Фи́рсова; also Yelena or Jelena Firssowa; born 21 March 1950) is a Russian composer living in the UK.

== Life ==
Firsova was born in Leningrad into the family of physicists Oleg Firsov and Viktoria Lichko. She studied music in Moscow with Alexander Pirumov, Yuri Kholopov, Edison Denisov and Philip Herschkowitz. In 1979 she was blacklisted as one of the "Khrennikov's Seven" at the Sixth Congress of the Union of Soviet Composers for unapproved participation in some festivals of Soviet music in the West. She was married to the composer Dmitri Smirnov and lives in the United Kingdom. Their children are Philip Firsov (an artist and sculptor), and Alissa Firsova (a composer, pianist and conductor).

She has composed more than a hundred compositions in many different genres including chamber opera The Nightingale and the Rose after Oscar Wilde and Christina Rossetti (premiered at the 1994 Almeida Opera Festival, London), an orchestra work Augury, (premiered at the 1992 BBC Proms) that includes a choral setting of William Blake's famous lines "To see the world in a grain of sand..." and Requiem to Anna Akhmatova's poem for soprano, chorus and orchestra (premiered at the Konzerthaus Berlin in September 2003).

Her favourite genre is a chamber cantata for solo voice and ensemble (or orchestra). Some of them are written to the poems by Alexander Pushkin, Marina Tsvetaeva, Boris Pasternak and Oleg Prokofiev. However, most of them are setting the poems by her favourite poet Osip Mandelstam that include Earthly Life, Tristia, The Stone, Forest Walks, Before the Thunderstorm, Stygian Song, Secret Way, Seashell, Whirlpool, Silentium, Winter Songs, and Petrarch's Sonnets (in Russian translation by Osip Mandelstam).

She received commissions from many music festivals, orchestras and ensembles including the Concertgebouw Orchestra, Brodsky Quartet, Manchester Wind Orchestra, Schubert Ensemble, Freden Festival, BBC Proms, Asiago Festival, and Expo 2000 (Hanover). Her music is available through publishers Boosey & Hawkes, London; Hans Sikorski, Hamburg; G. Schirmer, New York.

== Works ==
=== Concerto ===
- Cello Concerto No. 1 (1973)
- Chamber Concerto No. 1 for flute and strings (1978)
- Chamber Concerto No. 2 (Cello Concerto No. 2, 1982)
- Violin Concerto No. 2 (1983)
- Chamber Concerto No. 3 (Piano Concerto No. 1, 1985)
- Chamber Concerto No. 4 for horn and ensemble (1987)
- Chamber Concerto No. 5 (Cello Concerto No. 3, 1996)
- Chamber Concerto No. 6 (Piano Concerto No. 2, 1996)

=== Ensembles ===
- Odyssey for 7 players (1990)
- Petrarch's Sonnets (translated by Osip Mandelstam) for voice and ensemble (1976)
- Music for 12 for ensemble (1986)
- Insomnia, for four singers (Pushkin, 1993)
- The Night for voice and saxophone quartet (Boris Pasternak, 1978)
- Stygian Song for soprano and chamber ensemble (Mandelstam, 1989)
- Before the Thunderstorm, cantata for soprano and ensemble (Mandelstam, 1994)
- Black Bells for piano and ensemble (2005)
- Piano Trio, Op. 8 (1972) 9'. Trio, cl, vn, pfn, 1990, 9'. Boosey & Hawkes.

=== Quartet ===
- Misterioso, String Quartet No. 3 (1980)
- Amoroso, String Quartet No. 4 (1989)
- Silentium for voice and string quartet (Mandelstam, 1991)
- Lagrimoso, String Quartet No. 5 (1992)
- String Quartet No. 6 (1994)
- Compassione, String Quartet No. 7 (1995)
- The Stone Guest, String Quartet No. 8 (1995)
- The Door is Closed, String Quartet No. 9 (1996)
- La malinconia, String Quartet No. 10 (1998)
- Purgatorio, String Quartet No. 11, completed in 2008
- Farewell, String Quartet No. 12 (2005)

=== Cantata ===
- The Stone, cantata for voice and symphony orchestra (Mandelstam, 1983)
- Earthly Life, chamber cantata for soprano and ensemble (Mandelstam, 1984)
- Forest walks, cantata for soprano and ensemble (Mandelstam, 1987)

=== Orchestral ===
- Augury for chorus and orchestra (William Blake 1988)
- Nostalgia for orchestra (1989)
- Tristia, cantata for voice and chamber orchestra (Mandelstam, 1979)
- The River of Time for chorus and chamber orchestra in memory of Edison Denisov (Gavrila Derzhavin, 1997)
- Captivity for wind orchestra (1998)
- Leaving for string orchestra (1998)
- Cassandra, for orchestra (1992)
- Secret Way for voice and orchestra (Mandelstam, 1992)
- Das erste ist vergangen (Christushymnus 2000) (The Former Things are Passed Away) for soprano, bass, mixed choir, and chamber orchestra (Franz Kafka, Bible, etc., 1999)
- Requiem for soprano, chorus and orchestra (Anna Akhmatova, 2001)
- The Garden of Dreams, Homage to Dmitri Shostakovich for orchestra (2004)

=== Opera ===
- A Feast in Time of Plague, chamber opera after Alexander Pushkin (1973)
- The Nightingale and the Rose, chamber opera after Oscar Wilde and Christina Rossetti (1991)

=== Vocal ===
- Three Poems of Osip Mandelstam, for voice and piano (1980)
- Shakespeare's Sonnets for voice and organ (or saxophone quartet, 1981)
- Seashell for soprano and ensemble (Mandelstam, 1991)
- Whirlpool for voice, flute and percussion (Mandelstam, 1991)
- Distance for voice, clarinet and string quartet (Marina Tsvetaeva, 1992)
- No, it is not a Migraine for baritone and piano (Mandelstam, 1995)
- The Scent of Absence for bass, flute and harp (Oleg Prokofiev, 1998)
- Winter Songs for soprano and cello (Mandelstam, 2003)

=== Solo ===
- Suite for viola solo, Op. 2 (1967)
- Sonata for clarinet solo, Op. 16 (1976)
- For Slava for solo cello (2007)

== Discography ==
- Misterioso, String Quartet No.3 Op.24 in: Lydian Quartet in Moscow: E. Firsova, Chaushian, Child, Lee Art and Electronics: AED 10108 Stereo
- Amoroso, String Quartet No.4 Op.40 in: Chilingirian Quartet: Stravinsky, Schnittke, Smirnov, Roslavets, E. Firsova: Music for String Quartet, Conifer Classics 75605 512522
- La Malinconia, String Quartet No.10 Op.84 in: Brodsky Quartet: Beethoven Op.18 and six more: Alvarez, Beamish, E. Firsova, Jegede, Smirnov, Tanaka, Vanguard Classics 99212
- Chamber Concerto No.1 for Flute and Strings Op.19 in: Works by modern composers of Moscow: Smirnov, Bobilev, E. Firsova, Pavlenko, Artiomov, Mobile Fidelity MFCD 906
- Cassandra for symphony orchestra Op.60 (1992) together with Sofia Gubaidulina: Pro et contra BIS CD-668 STEREO
- The Mandelstam Cantatas (Forest Walks, Earthly Life, Before the Thunderstorm) Studio for New Music Moscow, Igor Dronov, conductor; Ekaterina Kichigina, soprano Megadisc MDC 7816
- For Alissa Op. 102 (2002) in: RUSSIAN ÉMIGRÉS: Rachmaninov, Smirnov, E. Firsova, A. Firsova: Alissa Firsova, piano: Vivat 109 DDD
  - Homage to Canisy, Op.129 for Cello & Piano
  - Lost Vision, Op. 137 for Piano Solo
  - A Triple Portrait, Op.132, commissioned by Marsyas Trio (2011)
  - Night Songs, Op.125 for Mezzo-Soprano, Flute & Cello
  - Spring Sonata, Op.27 for Flute & Piano
  - For Slava, Op.120 for Solo Cello
  - Meditation in the Japanese Garden, Op.54 for Flute, Cello & Piano
  - Three Poems of Osip Mandelstam, Op.23 for Soprano & Piano
  - Tender is the Sorrow, Op.130 for Flute, String Trio and Piano in: A Triple Portrait. Chamber Music by Elena Firsova – Marsyas Trio, Meridian: CDE84635

== Bibliography ==
- Elena Firsova: On Music; in Sowjetische Musik im Licht der Perestroika, pp. 337–8, Laaber-Verlag, Germany, (German translation by Hannelore Gerlach and Jürgen Köchel) 1990
