= Alissa Firsova =

Russian composer (born 1986)

- Алиса Фирсова
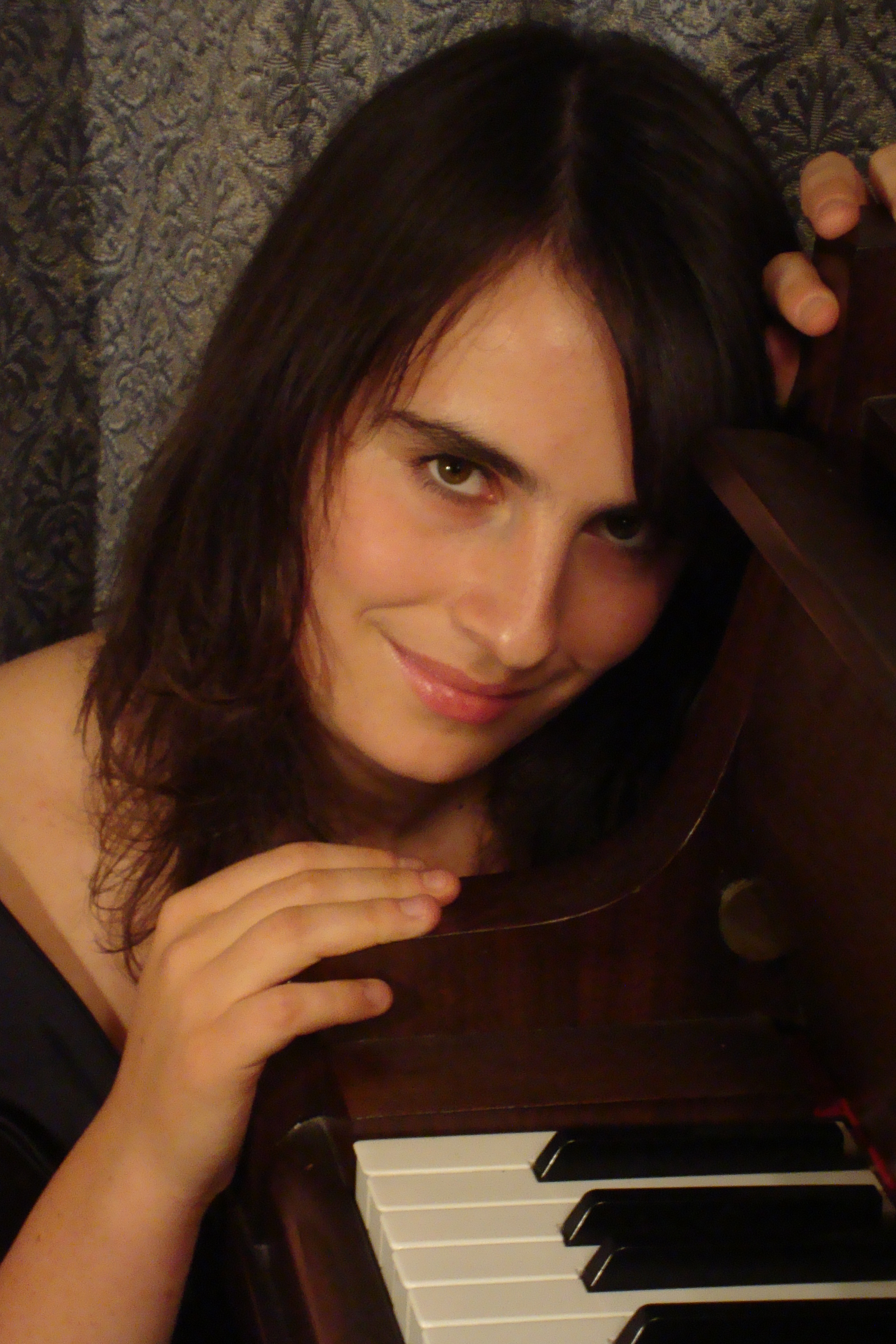
- Born: 24 July 1986 (age 39); Moscow, Russian SSR, Soviet Union
- Occupations: Composer; pianist; conductor

Alissa Firsova (Russian: Алиса Фирсова; born 24 July 1986) is a Russian-British classical composer, pianist and conductor.

== Biography ==
Born in Moscow to the composers Elena Firsova and Dmitri Smirnov, she moved to the UK in 1991.

In 2001 she won the BBC/Guardian/Proms Young Composer Competition with her piano piece "Les Pavots".

She graduated from Purcell School as a composer and pianist in 2004, and Royal Academy of Music as a pianist in 2009, where she also developed her conducting studies with Paul Brough.

In 2009 she entered the Conducting Postgraduate Course in Royal Academy of Music under the tuition of Colin Metters.

Her piano teachers included Tatiana Kantorovich, Valéria Szervánszky, James Gibb, Simon Mulligan, Hamish Milne, Ian Fountain, and Stephen Kovacevich. Among her composition teachers were Jeoffrey Sharkey, Richard Dubugnon, Jonathan Cole and Simon Speare. She also participated in workshops and master classes with composers Nicholas Maw, Simon Holt, Anthony Gilbert, David Bedford, David Matthews, and Mark-Anthony Turnage.

She had her Wigmore Hall debut in May 2009, followed by a Royal Albert Hall debut playing Stravinsky's Les Noces in the Proms festival in August. Her "Bach Allegro", commissioned by BBC Proms, was premiered in Royal Albert Hall in August 2010 by the Royal Philharmonic Orchestra under Andrew Litton.

Her solo piano debut CD Russian Emigres was released by the Vivat label. Alissa's music is featured in a Proms Portrait on 27 August 2015, prior to the world premiere of her "Bergen’s Bonfire" by the Bergen Philharmonic Orchestra and Andrew Litton.

== Works ==
- Op. 1, Les Pavots for solo piano
- Op. 2, Strength Through Joy for symphony orchestra
- Op. 3, Three Pieces for cello and piano
- Op. 4, The Entire City for string quintet
- Op. 5, I tell you the truth, today you will be with me in heaven for wind and string ensemble
- Op. 6, Rhapsody for solo violin
- Op. 7, Lyrisches Stuck for viola and piano
- Op. 8, Prophet for mixed chorus
- Op. 9, Expressions for clarinet and piano
- Op. 10, Loss for clarinet quintet
- Op. 11, The Endless Corridor for piano
- Op. 12, Birth of Remembrance for flute, clarinet, violin and cello
- Op. 13, Lune Rouge for piano
- Op. 14, Age of Reason for string quartet
- Op. 15, Celebration for clarinet, flute, violin and cello
- Op. 16, Tamaris for two cellos
- Op. 17, Bluebells for piano solo, clarinet, horn, string quartet and percussion (third movement of Family Concerto, In memory of Dmitri Shostakovich – family project)
- Op. 18, Paradiso for string quartet (third movement of "Divine Comedy" – family project)
- Op. 19, Freedom (Clarinet Concerto)
- Op. 20, Zhivago Songs to Boris Pasternak's poems for voice and piano
- Op. 21, Moonlight over the Sea based on Munch's painting for solo violin
- Op. 22, Chateau de Canisy for voice and piano
- Op. 23, Souvenir Melancolique for clarinet and horn
- Bach Allegro for large symphony orchestra (transcription of the third movement of Bach's 3rd Viola da Gamba Sonata, BWV 1029). Proms Commission 2010.
- Op. 24, Kubla Khan for tenor, bayan, violin and cello (fifth movement of family project)
- Op. 25, Gallo Variations for chamber orchestra
- Op. 26, Unity for bass-baritone and piano
- Op. 27, Serenade for Strings for string orchestra
- Op. 28, Paradisi Gloria for SATB choir a cappella
- Op. 29, Fantasy for cello and piano
- Op. 30, Stabat Mater for SATB choir a cappella
- Op. 31, Bergen’s Bonfire for Symphony Orchestra (Triple winds)
- Op. 32, Tree of Hope for 4 Harps
- Op. 33, Le Soleil de Conques for two solo cellos and string orchestra
- Op. 34, Bride of the Wind for piano-duet
- Op. 35, Asiago Concerto for piano trio and chamber orchestra
- Op. 36, Tennyson Fantasy for string quartet
