= Harvard Aesthetes =

American poet

The Harvard Aesthetes was a group of poets attending Harvard University in a period roughly between 1912 and 1919. It includes:

- Malcolm Cowley (1898–1989)
- E. E. Cummings (1894–1962)
- Winslow Wilson (also known as Winslow Wilson, Pico Miran, and Tex Wilson), (1892-1974)
- S. Foster Damon (1893–1971)
- John Dos Passos (1896–1970)
- Robert Hillyer (1895–1961)
- John Brooks Wheelwright (1897–1940)

== Sources ==
- Virginia Spencer Carr, Dos Passos : a life, Garden City, N.Y. : Doubleday, 1984. ISBN 978-0-385-12964-0
- Jonathan Freedman, Professions of taste : Henry James, British aestheticism and commodity culture, Stanford, Calif. : Stanford University Press, 1990. ISBN 978-0-8047-1784-7
