= Robert Hillyer =

American poet (1895–1961)

- Born: Robert Silliman Hillyer; June 3, 1895; East Orange, New Jersey, US
- Died: December 24, 1961 (aged 66); Wilmington, Delaware, US
- Education: Harvard University (BA)
- Occupations: poet, writer, university faculty
- Writing career
- Notable work: The Collected Verse of Robert Hillyer; A Letter to Robert Frost and Others
- Notable awards: Pulitzer Prize in Poetry, 1934
- Literary movement: Harvard Aesthetes

Robert Silliman Hillyer (June 3, 1895 – December 24, 1961) was an American poet and professor of English literature. He won a Pulitzer Prize for poetry in 1934.

== Early life ==
Hillyer was born in East Orange, New Jersey, to an old Connecticut family. He attended Kent School in Kent, Connecticut. After high school, he attended Harvard University, graduating cum laude in 1917. While there, he was the editor of the literary magazine The Harvard Advocate, and was affiliated with the group known as the Harvard Aesthetes.

When World War I began, he went to France and volunteered for the Norton-Harjes Ambulance Corps, along with Harvard classmate John Dos Passos. Once the United States entered the war, he joined the American forces. After serving as an ambulance driver, Hillyer later returned to France to work in the US Ordnance Department. After the Armistice, Hillyer worked as a military courier for the 1919 peace conference in Paris. For a while, Hillyer and John Dos Passos shared a flat in Paris and even collaborated on an unpublished novel which they called "Great Novel" (or "G.N.", or "Seven Times round the Walls of Jericho"). Eventually, the novel was abandoned in 1921, even though Dos Passos said that Hillyer's contributions had "genuineness" and "more tone than mine."

== Career ==
=== Academic ===
Hillyer became a professor of English at Harvard University in 1919. In the late 1920s, he taught at Trinity College and was made a member of the Epsilon chapter of the literary fraternity St. Anthony Hall in 1927.

From 1937 to 1944, he was named to the Boylston Professorship of Rhetoric and Oratory at Harvard. From 1948 to 1951 Hillyer was a visiting professor at Kenyon College. He also taught at the University of Delaware from 1952 until his death. While at Delaware Hillyer did various regular poetry readings between 1953 and 1960 which were recorded and are now available for listening through the university's archives.

Over his academic life, Hillyer taught several writers (and poets) who later became well-known such as Theodore Roethke, James Gould Cozzens, Howard Nemerov, James Agee, Norman Mailer, Robert Fitzgerald and John Simon.

=== Poet ===
In 1919, Hillyer described himself as “a conservative and religious poet in a radical and blasphemous age." In 1934, he received a Pulitzer Prize for Poetry for his book The Collected Verse of Robert Hillyer. His work is in meter and often rhyme and he tended to write about death, love and nature. He is known for his sonnets and for poems such as "Theme and Variations" (on his war experiences) and the light "Letter to Robert Frost."

He became president of the Conservative Poetry Society of America. In this capacity, he attacked modernist poets such as T. S. Eliot and Ezra Pound.

== Awards and honors ==
- Pulitzer Prize for Poetry for "Collected Verse" in 1934.
- He was named to the Boylston Professorship of Rhetoric and Oratory at Harvard University in 1937.
- His papers are housed at Syracuse University.

== Works ==
=== Poetry ===
- Pre-Pulitzer Poetry (Ebook, Personville Press, 2023). Includes the full text of 6 poetry books published by Hillyer before winning the Pulitzer Prize.
- The Collected Poems (Alfred Knopf, 1961)
- The Relic & Other Poems (Knopf, 1957).
- The Suburb by the Sea: New Poems (Knopf, 1952)
- The Death of Captain Nemo: A Narrative Poem (A.A. Knopf, 1949)
- Poems for Music, 1917–1947. (1947)
- Pattern of a Day (1940)
- In a Time of Mistrust (1939)
- A Letter to Robert Frost and Others (1937).
- The Collected Verse of Robert Hillyer. (A. A. Knoft, 1933)
- The Gates of the Compass: A Poem in Four Parts Together with Twenty-Two Shorter Pieces (Viking Press, 1930)
- The Seventh Hill (Viking Press, 1928)
- The Halt in the Garden (Elkin Matthews,1925)
- The Coming Forth by Day: An Anthology of Poems from the Egyptian Book of the Dead (B.J. Brimmer Company, 1923)
- Hills Give Promise, a Volume of Lyrics, Together with Carmus: A Symphonic Poem (B.J. Brimmer Company, 1923)
- Alchemy: A Symphonic Poem (Brentano's, 1920)
- The Five Books of Youth (Brentano's, 1920)
- Sonnets and Other Lyrics (Harvard University Press, 1917)
- Eight Harvard Poets (1917), which included works by E. E. Cummings and John Dos Passos

=== Novels ===
- Riverhead (Alfred Knopf, 1932)
- My Heart for Hostage (Random House, 1942) In 2022, this novel was digitized and made available for free download by Personville Press.

=== Criticism and scholarship ===
- In Pursuit of Poetry (McGraw-Hill, 1960)*
- First Principles of Verse. (The Writer, Inc., 1938).
- Some Roots of English Poetry (Wheaton College Press, 1933)

=== Editor and/or translator ===
- Oluf Friis (1922). A Book of Danish Verse: Translated in the Original Meters. Translators Samuel Foster Damon, Robert Hillyer. The American-Scandinavian Foundation.
- Kahlil Gibran. A Tear and a Smile. Introduction by Robert Hillyer. (A. A. Knopf, 1959).
- Eight More Harvard Poets. Edited by Samuel Foster Damon and Robert Hillyer. (Brentano, 1923)
- Complete Poetry and Selected Prose of John Donne and The Complete Poetry of William Blake, Introduction by Robert Hillyer, Random House: New York, 1941. pages xv-lv.

== Personal ==
In 1926, he married Dorothy Hancock Tilton. They had one son, but divorced in 1943.

He was 66 when he died in Wilmington, Delaware.

== See also ==
- List of ambulance drivers during World War I
