= Philip Sheffield =

British operatic tenor (born 1960)

Philip Sheffield (born 1960) is a British operatic tenor who has performed at major international opera houses, including world premieres.

== Life ==
Sheffield was born in Nairobi in 1960. He studied English literature at the Trinity College Cambridge, and voice at the Royal College of Music and the Guildhall School of Music and Drama. Before becoming an opera singer he was a member of The Swingle Singers and made recordings as a session and jazz singer, including being the polar bear in the best selling video of Raymond Briggs "The Bear" by Howard Blake. He made his operatic debut at La Monnaie in Brussels in 1988 in Monteverdi's L'incoronazione di Poppea. He performed lyric tenor roles such as Mozart's Ferrando in Così fan tutte and Tamino in The Magic Flute, and Lenski in Tchaikovsky's Eugene Onegin. Sheffield created the role of Terry Bond in Benedict Mason's Playing Away in a production of Opera North at the Grand Theatre, Leeds, broadcast by the BBC on 14 June 1994. He also appeared as Fenton in Hans-Jürgen von Bose's 63 Dream Palace, and as Alonso in The Tempest by Thomas Adès. In 1994, he took part in the world premiere of Elena Firsova's chamber opera The Nightingale and the Rose at the Almeida Theatre, conducted by David Parry. He sang the role of Parpignol in a 1995 recording of Puccini's La bohème in London, conducted by Antonio Pappano. He had the lead role of Živný in a 2020 production by the National Theatre Brno of Janáček's opera Osud (Destiny). He was a soloist in the biopic of Leonard Bernstein, Maestro, singing the tenor solo in Bernstein's MASS. He was part of the cast in the UK's only performance of Bernstein's A Quiet Place, singing the role of François.
