= Tiriel (character) =

Character in William Blake's mythological system

Tiriel is the eponymous character in a poem by William Blake written c.1789, and considered the first of his prophetic books. The character of Tiriel is often interpreted as a foreshadowing of Urizen, representative of conventionality and conformity, and one of the major characters in Blake's as yet unrealised mythological system.

== Synopsis ==
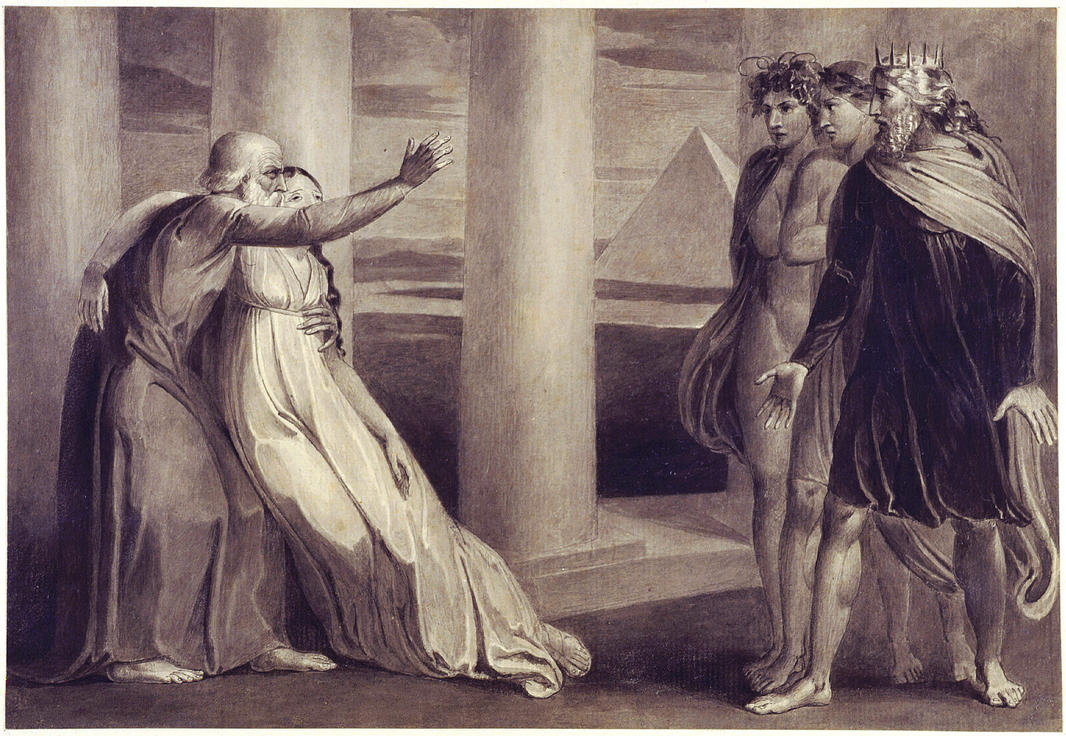
Tiriel supporting Myratana; the illustrated text is: "The aged man rais'd up his right hand to the heavens/His left supported Myratana shrinking in the pangs of death" (1:19-20).

Many years before the poem begins, the sons of Har and Heva revolted and abandoned their parents. Tiriel subsequently set himself up as a tyrant in the west, driving one of his brothers, Ijim, into exile in the wilderness, and chaining the other, Zazel, in a cave in the mountains. Tiriel then made slaves of his own children, until eventually, led by the eldest son, Heuxos, they too rebelled, overthrowing their father. Upon his demise, Tiriel refused their offer of refuge in the palace, and instead went into exile in the mountains with his wife, Myratana. Five years later, the poem begins with the now blind Tiriel returning to the kingdom with his dying wife, as he wants his children to see her death, believing them to be responsible and cursing them for betraying him five years previously. Soon thereafter, Myratana dies, and Tiriel's children again ask him to remain with them but he refuses and wanders away, again cursing them and telling them he will have his revenge.

After some time wandering, Tiriel eventually arrives at the "pleasant gardens" (2:10) of the Vales of Har, where he finds his parents, Har and Heva. However, they have both become senile and have regressed to a childlike state. Tiriel lies about who he is, claiming that he was cast into exile by the gods, who then destroyed his race. Excited by the visit, Har and Heva invite Tiriel to help them catch birds and listen to Har's singing in the "great cage" (3:21). Tiriel refuses to stay, however, claiming his journey is not yet at an end, and resumes his wandering.

He travels into the forest and soon encounters his brother Ijim, who has recently been terrorised by a shapeshifting spirit. Upon seeing Tiriel, Ijim immediately assumes that Tiriel is another manifestation of the spirit. Tiriel assures Ijim that he is, in fact, the real Tiriel, but Ijim does not believe him and decides to return to Tiriel's palace to see the real Tiriel and thus expose the spirit as an imposter. However, upon arriving at the palace, Heuxos informs Ijim that the Tiriel with him is indeed the real Tiriel, but Ijim suspects that the entire palace and everyone in it is part of the spirit's deception. As such, he leaves, and upon his departure, Tiriel, descending ever more rapidly into madness, curses his children even more passionately than before. Calling upon natural disasters, four of his five daughters and one hundred of his one hundred and thirty sons are destroyed, including Heuxos.

Tiriel then demands that his youngest and only surviving daughter, Hela, lead him back to the Vales of Har. She reluctantly agrees, but on the journey, she denounces him for his actions. Tiriel responds in a rage, turning her locks of hair into snakes, although he vows that if she brings him to the Vales of Har, he will return her hair to normal. On the way through the mountains, as they pass the cave wherein lives Zazel and his sons, Hela's cries of lamentation awaken them, and they hurl dirt and stones at Tiriel and Hela. Eventually, Tiriel and Hela reach the Vales of Har, but rather than celebrating his return, Tiriel condemns his parents, and the way they brought him up, declaring that his father's laws and his own wisdom now "end together in a curse" (8:8). Tiriel then dies at his parents' feet; "He ceast outstretch'd at Har & Heva's feet in awful death" (8:29).

== Background ==
As the former king of the west, Tiriel is of the body in Blake's mythological system, in which the west is assigned to Tharmas, representative of the senses. However, when he visits the Vales of Har, Tiriel falsely claims to be from the north, which is assigned to Urthona, representative of the imagination.

Most scholars agree that Tiriel's name was probably taken from Heinrich Cornelius Agrippa's De occulta philosophia libri tres (1651), where the name is associated with the planet Mercury and the elements sulphur and mercury. Harold Bloom, however, believes the name is a combination of the word 'tyrant' and the Hebrew word for God, El. In terms of Tiriel's character, David V. Erdman believes that he is partially based on King George III, who suffered bouts of insanity throughout 1788 and 1789. Erdman argues that "the pattern of Tiriel's "madness and deep dismay" parallels that of King George's," and thus the poem is "a symbolic portrait of the ruler of the British Empire. [Blake] knew that the monarch who represented the father principal of law and civil authority was currently insane." As evidence, Erdman points out that during his bouts of insanity, George tended to become hysterical in the presence of four of his five daughters, only the youngest, (Amelia), could calm him (in the poem, Tiriel destroys four of his daughters but spares the youngest, his favourite). Bloom believes that Tiriel is also partially based on William Shakespeare's King Lear and, in addition, is a satire "of the Jehovah of deistic orthodoxy, irascible and insanely rationalistic." Northrop Frye makes a similar claim; "He expects and loudly demands gratitude and reverence from his children because he wants to be worshipped as a god, and when his demands are answered by contempt he responds with a steady outpouring of curses. The kind of god which the existence of such tyrannical papas suggests is the jealous Jehovah of the Old Testament who is equally fertile in curses and pretexts for destroying his innumerable objects of hatred." Alicia Ostriker believes the character to be partially based on both Oedipus from Sophocles' Oedipus Rex and the prince of Tyre from the Book of Ezekiel (28:1-10), who is denounced by Ezekiel for trying to pass himself off as God. Looking at the character from a symbolic point of view, Frye argues that he "symbolises a society or civilisation in its decline."

== Blake's Mythology ==
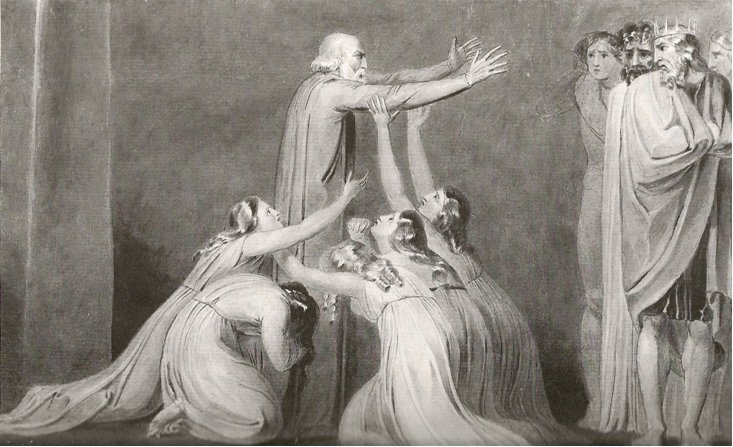
Tiriel Denouncing his Sons and Daughters (Fitzwilliam Museum); the illustrated text is "The cry was great in Tiriels palace his five daughters ran/And caught him by the garments weeping with cries of bitter woe/Aye now you feel the curse you cry. but may all ears be deaf/As Tiriels & all eyes as blind as Tiriels to your woes/May never stars shine on your roofs may never sun nor moon/Visit you but eternal fogs hover around your walls" (5:18-23).

Although Tiriel himself is not featured in any of Blake's later work, he is often seen as a foreshadowing of Urizen, limiter of men's desires, embodiment of tradition and conformity, and a central character in Blake's mythology, appearing in Visions of the Daughters of Albion (1793), America a Prophecy (1793), Europe a Prophecy (1794), The Book of Urizen (1794), The Book of Ahania (1795), The Book of Los (1795), The Song of Los (1795), Vala, or The Four Zoas (1796–1803), Milton a Poem (1804–1810), and Jerusalem The Emanation of the Giant Albion (1804–1820). Tiriel is similar to Urizen insofar as "he too revolted, set himself up as a tyrant, became a hypocrite, ruined his children by his curse, and finally collapsed."

Other aspects of Blake's mythology also begin to emerge in the actions of the character. For example, S. Foster Damon argues Tiriel's murder of four of his daughters and his corruption of the fifth is Blake's first presentation of the death of the four senses and the corruption of touch, or sex; "all imaginative activity based on the senses disappears except automatic sexual reproduction. Even this proves too much for his moral virtue." As Damon elaborates, "Hela's Medusan locks are the torturing thoughts of suppressed lust." The corruption of the senses, as initiated here by Tiriel, plays an important role throughout Europe a Prophecy ("the five senses whelm'd/In deluge o'er the earth-born man"), The Book of Urizen ("The senses inwards rush'd shrinking,/Beneath the dark net of infection"), The Song of Los ("Thus the terrible race of Los & Enitharmon gave/Laws & Religions to the sons of Har binding them more/And more to Earth: closing and restraining:/Till a Philosophy of Five Senses was complete"), The Four Zoas ("Beyond the bounds of their own self their senses cannot penetrate") and Jerusalem ("As the Senses of Men shrink together under the Knife of flint").

Another subtle connection with the later mythology is found when Tiriel has all but thirty of his sons killed; "And all the children in their beds were cut off in one night/Thirty of Tiriels sons remaind. to wither in the palace/Desolate. Loathed. Dumb Astonishd waiting for black death" (5:32-34). Damon believes this foreshadows The Book of Urizen, where Urizen brings about the fall of the thirty cities of Africa; "And their thirty cities divided/In form of a human heart", "And the thirty cities remaind/Surrounded by salt floods" (27:21-22 and 28:8-9).
