= Har (Blake) =

Character in William Blake's mythological system

Har is a character in the mythological writings of William Blake, who roughly corresponds to an aged Adam. His wife, Heva, corresponds to Eve. Har appears in Tiriel (1789) and The Song of Los (1795) and is briefly mentioned in The Book of Thel (1790) and Vala, or The Four Zoas (1796-1803).

== Synopsis ==
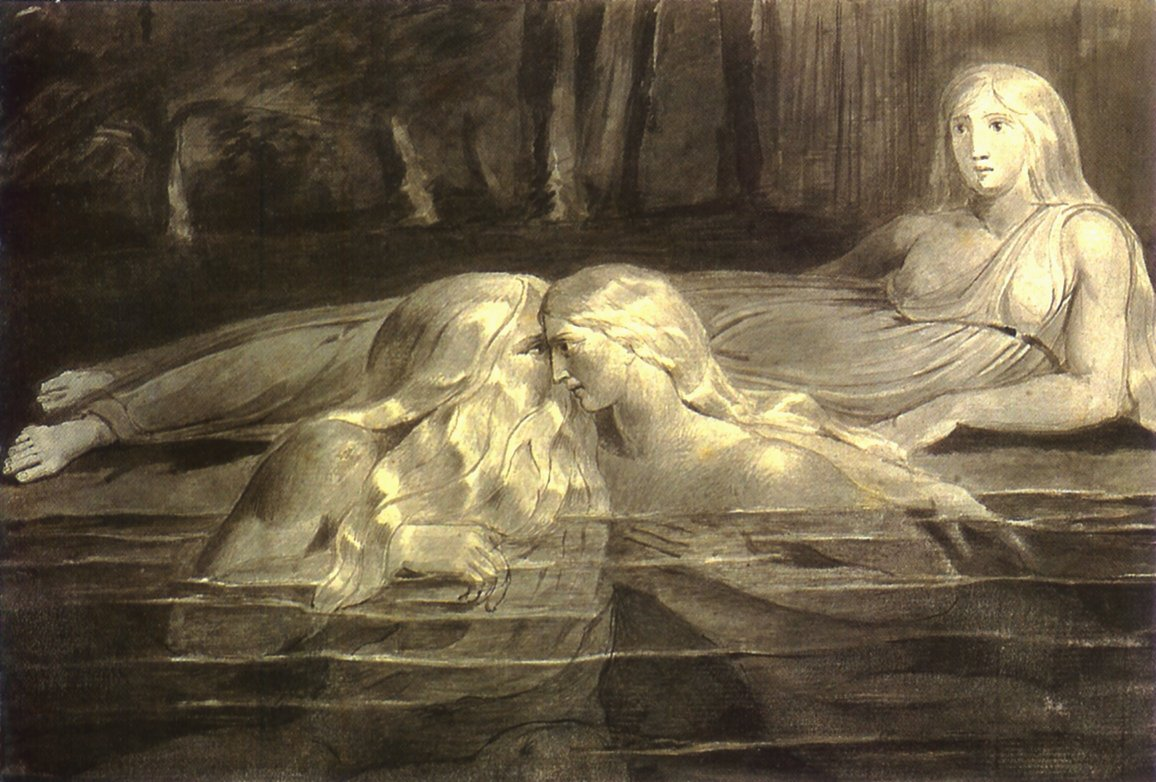
"Har and Heva bathing"; Har and Heva are shown naked in a shallow stream whilst Mnetha lies behind looking on.

Many years before Tiriel begins, Har was overthrown by his children, Tiriel, Ijim and Zazel. As time went by, he and his wife, Heva, came to reside in the Vales of Har, where they gradually succumbed to dementia, regressing to a childlike state to such an extent that they came to think their guardian, Mnetha, is their mother, spending their days chasing birds and singing in a "great cage" (Tiriel; 3:21). After Tiriel loses his throne to his own children, he visits Har and Heva. Excited by the visit, although unaware that Tiriel is their son, they ask him to stay with them, but he refuses and resumes his wanderings. Later, after Tiriel has had most of his own children killed, he returns to the Vales with the express purpose of condemning his parents and the way they brought him up, declaring that Har's laws and his own wisdom now "end together in a curse" (8:8);

The child springs from the womb. the father ready stands to form
The infant head while the mother idle plays with her dog on her couch
The young bosom is cold for lack of mothers nourishment & milk
Is cut off from the weeping mouth with difficulty & pain
The little lids are lifted & the little nostrils opend
The father forms a whip to rouze the sluggish senses to act
And scourges off all youthful fancies from the newborn man
Then walks the weak infant in sorrow compelld to number footsteps
Upon the sand. &c
And when the drone has reachd his crawling length
Black berries appear that poison all around him. Such was Tiriel
Compelld to pray repugnant & to humble the immortal spirit
Till I am subtil as a serpent in a paradise
Consuming all both flowers & fruits insects & warbling birds
And now my paradise is falln & a drear sandy plain
Returns my thirsty hissings in a curse on thee O Har
Mistaken father of a lawless race my voice is past

— Tiriel 8:12-28

Upon this declamation, Tiriel then dies at their feet.

In the Africa section of the later poem The Song of Los (1795), which is set chronologically before Tiriel, Har and Heva are forced to flee into the wilderness, after their family rebel against them. In their exile in the desert, they then turn into reptiles.

== Background ==
Mary S. Hall believes that Har's name is derived from Jacob Bryant's A New System or Analysis of Antient Mythology (1776), where Bryant conflates the Amazonian deities Harmon and Ares with the Egyptian deity Harmonia, wife of Cadmus. Blake had engraved plates for the book in the early 1780s, so he would certainly have been familiar with its content.

As a character, S. Foster Damon believes that Har represents both the "decadent poetry of Blake's day" and the traditional spirit of Christianity. Northrop Frye reaches a similar conclusion but also sees divergence in the character, arguing that although Har and Heva are based on Adam and Eve, "Har is distinguished from Adam. Adam is ordinary man in his mixed twofold nature of imagination and Selfhood. Har is the human Selfhood which, though men spend most of their time trying to express it, never achieves reality and is identified only as death. Har, unlike Adam, never outgrows his garden but remains there shut up from the world in a permanent state of near-existence." Harold Bloom agrees with this interpretation, arguing that "Har is natural man, the isolated selfhood." Bloom also believes that Har is comparable to Struldbruggs from Jonathan Swift's Gulliver's Travels (1726) and Tithonus from Alfred, Lord Tennyson's poem of the same name (1859).

'Har' is the Hebrew word for 'mountain', thus giving an inherent irony to the phrase "Vales of Har". Damon believes this conveys the ironic sense that "he who was a mountain now lives in a vale, cut off from mankind.

== Blake's mythology ==
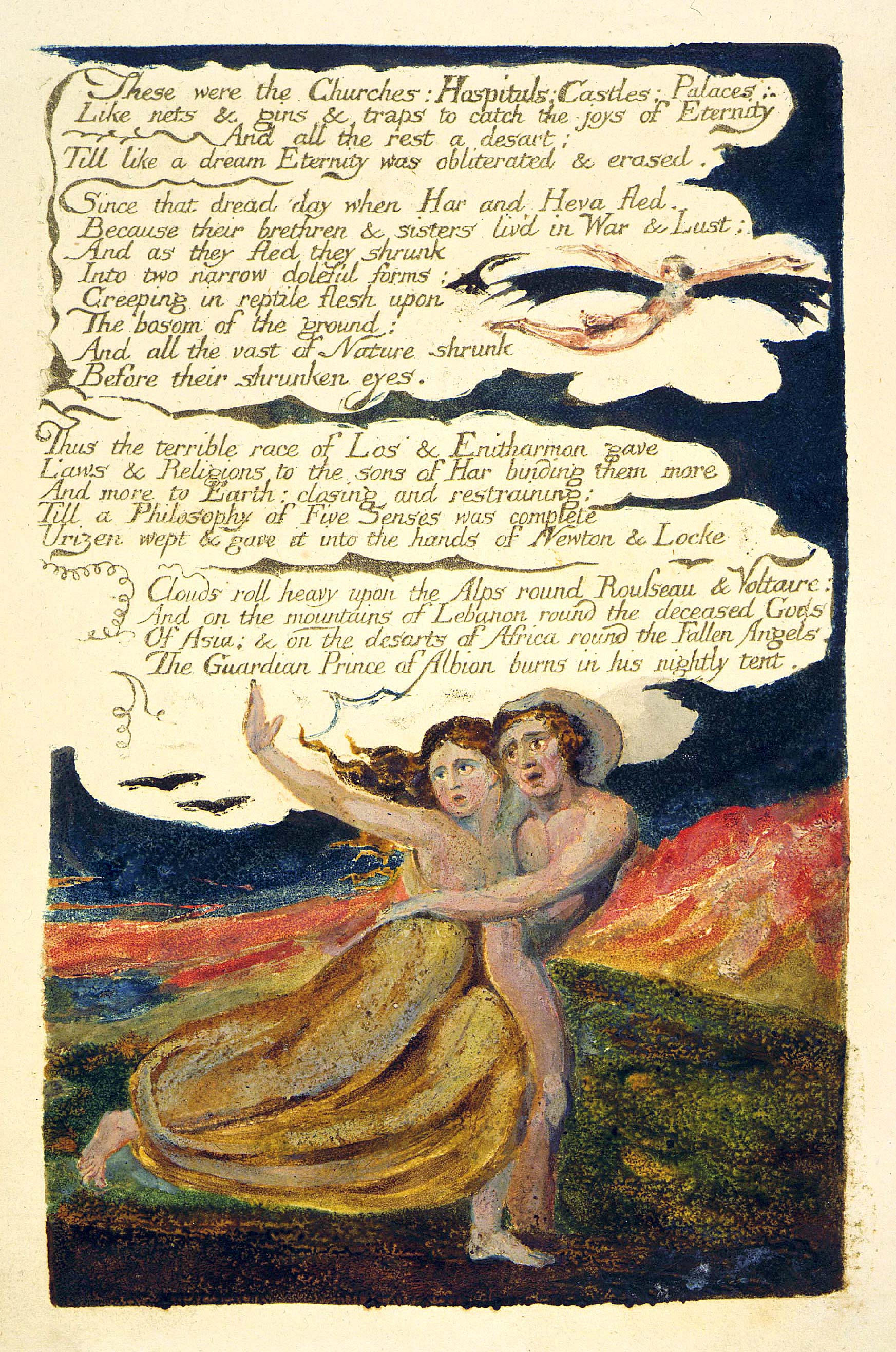
The Song of Los, Plate 4, showing Har and Heva fleeing from the "War & Lust" of their brethren.

Both Har and the Vales of Har feature in Blake's subsequent prophetic work. The Vales of Har are mentioned in The Book of Thel (1790), and it is in the Vales where lives Thel herself. Throughout the poem they are represented as a place of purity and innocence; "I walk through the vales of Har. and smell the sweetest flowers" (3:18). At the end of the poem, when Thel is shown the world of experience outside the Vales, she panics and flees back to the safety of her home; "The Virgin started from her seat, & with a shriek./Fled back unhinderd till she came into the vales of Har" (6:21-22).

In the Africa section The Song of Los (1795), which is set chronologically before Tiriel, Har and Heva flee into the wilderness, after their family rebel against them:

Since that dread day when Har and Heva fled.
Because their brethren & sisters liv'd in War & Lust;
And as they fled they shrunk
Into two narrow doleful forms:
Creeping in reptile flesh upon
The bosom of the ground:

— The Song of Los: plate 4, lines 4-9

Damon refers to this transformation as turning them into "serpents of materialism," which he relates to their role in Tiriel.

Har and Ijim are also briefly mentioned in Vala, or The Four Zoas (1796-1803), where Har is the sixteenth son of Los and Enitharmon, and Ijim the eighteenth. Har's immediate father is Satan, representative of self-love in Blake, and his children are Ijim and Ochim (The Four Zoas, VIII:360).
