= Siegfried Schoenbohm =

German opera stage director

Siegfried Schoenbohm (1938 – September 16, 2006) He died and is buried in Raidelbach, Germany. He was an opera stage director, born in South Dakota, USA. He was an assistant of Walter Felsenstein.

He worked at: Komische Oper Berlin (1966ff), Theater Heidelberg (1973–1978), Theater Freiburg (1981–1983), and Staatstheater Kassel (1983–1991). He was guest director (premieres) at Staatsoper Hamburg, Grillo-Theater Essen, Oper Bonn here staging Richard Wagner's Der Ring des Nibelungen, Die Walküre 1998, Siegfried 1999, Dortmund, Hanover, Frankfurt am Main, Athens. He also was the first stage-director of Tiriel. He was the librettist of Argyrēs Kounadēs' Die Bakchen (1996, after Euripides' The Bacchae).
