= Dmitri Smirnov (composer) =

Russian composer (1948–2020)

- Дми́трий Смирно́в
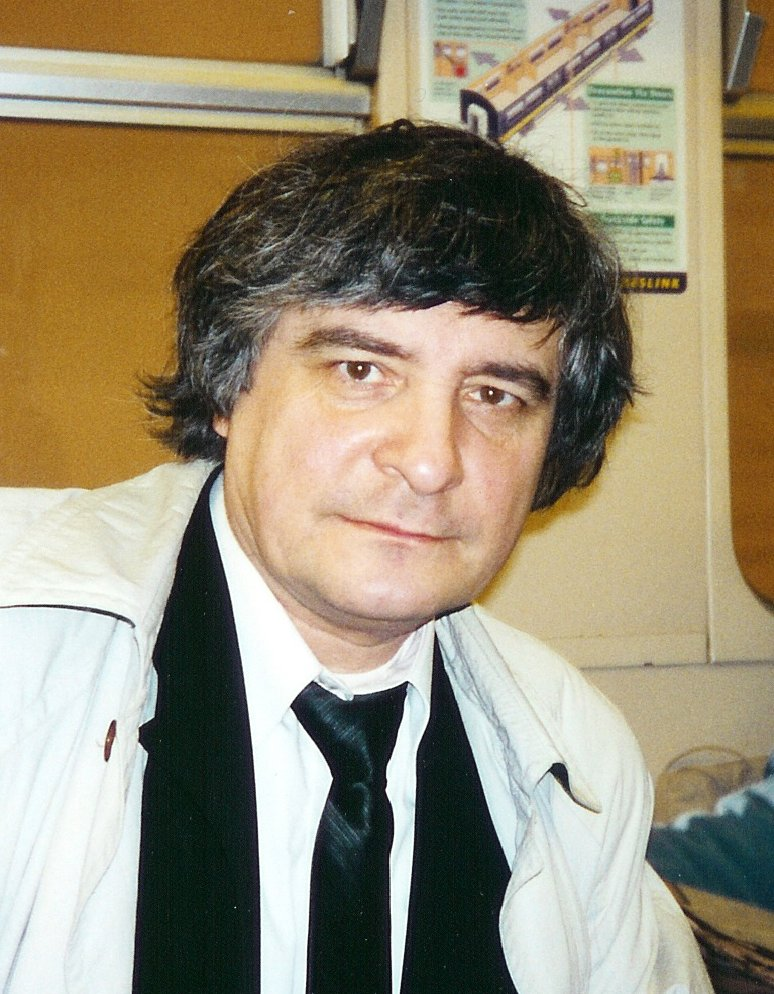
- Born: Dmitri Nikolaevich Smirnov; 2 November 1948; Minsk, Byelorussian SSR, Soviet Union
- Died: 9 April 2020 (aged 71); Watford, England
- Occupations: Composer; Academic teacher
- Spouse: Elena Firsova (m. 1972)
- Children: 2

Dmitri Nikolaevich Smirnov (Russian: Дми́трий Никола́евич Смирно́в; 2 November 1948 – 9 April 2020) was a Russian-British composer and academic teacher, who also published as Dmitri N. Smirnov and D. Smirnov-Sadovsky. He wrote operas, symphonies, string quartets and other chamber music, and vocal music from song to oratorio. Many of his works were inspired by the art of William Blake.

== Career ==
Smirnov was born in Minsk into a family of opera singers: his parents were Nikolay Senkin-Sadovsky and Eugenia Smirnova. His family moved to Ulan-Ude and then Bishkek, where he spent most of his childhood. He studied at the Moscow Conservatory from 1967 to 1972, composition with Nikolai Sidelnikov, instrumentation with Yuri Kholopov, and analysis with Edison Denisov. He also studied privately with Philip Herschkowitz, a pupil of Anton Webern.

He worked as an editor for the music publishing house Sovietski Kompositor from 1973 to 1980, and then turned to freelance composing. He received first prize for his composition Solo for Harp at a competition of the International Harp Week in Maastricht in 1976, which won him international recognition. In 1979, Smirnov was blacklisted as one of "Khrennikov's Seven" at the Sixth Congress of the Union of Soviet Composers for unapproved participation in some festivals of Soviet music in the West. Smirnov was one of the founders of Russia's new ACM - Association for Contemporary Music, established in Moscow in 1990. From 1991, he lived in England. He was composer in residence at the University of Cambridge's St John's College and at Dartington, and visiting professor at Keele University from 1993 to 1998. From 2003 he taught at Goldsmiths College at the University of London.

Many of Smirnov's works reflect his fascination with the poetry and art of William Blake. He composed a song cycle based on Blake's The Season (1979), which grew into his first symphony, subtitled The Seasons. His two operas Tiriel and Thel on text by William Blake were premiered in 1989, the first at the Freiburg Festival in Germany, and the second at the Almeida Theatre in London. His First Symphony was premiered the same year at the Tanglewood Festival and the Southbank Centre in London. His orchestral Mozart-Variations were staged as a ballet in Pforzheim in Germany in 1992. Other premieres include the oratorio A Song of Liberty in Leeds in 1993, played by the BBC Philharmonic, the Cello Concerto in Manchester in 1996, the cantata Song of Songs in Geneva in 2001, and the Triple Concerto No. 2 for violin, double bass and harp, which was performed at the Barbican Centre on 26 May 2004, combined with Mahler's Second Symphony "Resurrection", with Andrew Davis conducting the London Symphony Orchestra & Chorus.

His work has been performed by many notable conductors, including: Riccardo Muti, Sir Andrew Davis, Dennis Russell Davies, Peter Eötvös, Oliver Knussen, Vassily Sinaisky, Pavel Kogan, Gennady Rozhdestvensky, Gunther Schuller, and Yan Pascal Tortelier. He composed Jacob's Ladder and River of Life for the London Sinfonietta, String Quartets Nos. 3 and 6 for the Brodsky Quartet, Song of Songs on a commission from the Orchestre de la Suisse Romande, and Between Scylla and Charybdis for the string orchestras Nieuw Sinfonietta Amsterdam and the English String Orchestra.

== Personal life ==
Smirnov was married to the composer Elena Firsova. They moved to the United Kingdom in 1991, living in St Albans near London from 1998. Their children are Philip Firsov (an artist and sculptor) and Alissa Firsova (a composer, pianist and conductor). He died on 9 April 2020 in Watford from the COVID-19 pandemic.

== Works ==
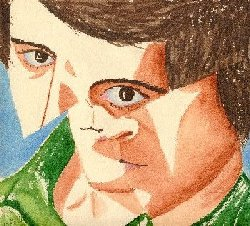
Self portrait

Smirnov's works were published by Hans Sikorski in Hamburg, Boosey & Hawkes in London, and G. Schirmer in New York City.

- Piano Sonata No. 1 (1967), No. 2 (1980), No. 3 (1992), No. 4 String of Destiny (2000), No. 5 (2001), No. 6 Blake-Sonata (2008)
- Violin Sonata No. 1 (1969), No. 2 (1979), No. 3 "es ist .." in memory of Oleg Firsov (1998), No. 4 (2005)
- Piano Concerto No. 1 (1971), No. 2 (1978)
- Eternal Refuge for voice and piano trio (also orchestra version), text by Mikhail Bulgakov (1972)
- String Quartet No. 1 (1974), No. 2 (1985), No. 3 (1993), No. 4 (1993), No. 5 (1994), No. 6 (1998), No. 7 (2005), No. 8 Inferno (2007)
- Clarinet Concerto (1974)
- Pastorale for orchestra (1975)
- Mirages for saxophone quartet (1975)
- Solo for Harp (1976)
- The Sorrow of past Days for voice, flute, percussion, violin and cello, text by Alexander Pushkin (1976)
- Triple Concerto No. 1 for saxophone, piano, double bass, strings & percussion (1977)
- Piano Trio No. 1 (1977), No. 2 (1992), No. 3 "Tri-o-Tri" (2005)
- Cello Sonata (1978)
- The Seasons, song cycle for voice, flute, viola and harp, text by William Blake (1979)
- Symphony No. 1 The Seasons (1980)
- Symphony No. 2 Destiny for four soloists, mixed chorus & orchestra, text by Friedrich Hölderlin (1982)
- The Night Rhymes cantata for voice & orchestra, text by Alexander Pushkin (1982)
- Tiriel, opera after William Blake (1983–1985)
- Thel (or The Lamentations of Thel), chamber opera after William Blake (1986)
- Mozart-Variations for orchestra (1987)
- The Visions of Coleridge for voice and 10 players, text by S. T. Coleridge (1987)
- Songs of Love and Madness for voice, clarinet, celesta, harp & string trio, text by William Blake (1988)
- The Seven Angels of William Blake for piano (1988)
- Blake’s Pictures (ballet): The Moonlight Story (1988), Jacob's Ladder (1990), Abel (1991), The River of Life (1992)
- Eight-line Poems for voice, flute, horn, harp and string trio, text by Osip Mandelstam
- Violin Concerto No. 1 (1990), No. 2 (1995). No. 3 (1996)
- A Song of Liberty, oratorio for four soloists, mixed chorus and orchestra, text by William Blake (1991)
- Piano Quintet for piano, violin, viola, cello & double bass (1992)
- Cello concerto (1992)
- Ariel Songs for voice, 2 recorders, cello & harpsichord, text by William Shakespeare (1993)
- The Guardians of Space for orchestra (1994)
- Symphony No. 3 Voyages for orchestra (1995)
- The Music of the Spheres for piano (1995)
- The Bride in her Grave, opera, libretto by Ruth Fainlight (1995)
- Elegy in memory of Edison Denisov, in two versions: (a) for solo cello, (b) for sixteen players (1997)
- The Bird of Time for orchestra (1997)
- Song of Songs, cantata for soprano, tenor, mixed chorus & orchestra, text by King Solomon (1997)
- Between Scylla and Charybdis for string orchestra (1997)
- Mass for mixed chorus (1998)
- Opus 111 for clarinet, cello & piano (1998)
- Twilight for soprano and six players, text by James Joyce (1998–2000)
- Portrait in memory of Dmitri Shostakovich, for wind octet & double bass (1999)
- Concerto Piccolo (to Mstislav Rostropovich) for cello and orchestra (2001)
- Innocence of Experience for tape, text by William Blake (2001)
- Metaplasm No. 1 for piano (also for orchestra, 2002), No. 2 for piano (2002)
- Triple Concerto No. 2 for violin, harp, double bass and orchestra (2003)
- Dream Journey for voice, flute clarinet, vln, cello and piano, text by Matsuo Bashō (2003–2004)
- Red Bells in memory of Dmitri Shostakovich, the first movement of Family Concerto for piano and ensemble of seven players, composed jointly with his wife and daughter, Elena Firsova and Alissa Firsova (2005)
- Requiem for four soloists, mixed chorus and orchestra (2006)
- Amore sola for solo violin (2006)
- Proverbs of Hell for voice and piano, text by William Blake (2006)
- The Lonely Wanderer for voice and cello, text by Lermontov (2007)
- Duo in Green for 2 violins (2008)
- Space Odyssey for large orchestra (2008)
- From the Pine to the Moon for voice and cello, text by Lermontov (2009)
- The Book of Constellations for ensemble (2009–)
- The Last Trumpet for trumpet and timpani (2010)
- Kubla Khan: A Vision in a Dream for tenor (or soprano), bajan, violin and cello, text by S. T. Coleridge, composed jointly with Firsova and Firsova (2010/2011)
- Zodiac for orchestra (2010–2013)
- Canisi-Variations for violin and piano (2011)
- Papageno-Variations for orchestra (after Beethoven's 12 Variations for cello & piano, Op. 66) (2012)
- Visionary Heads (after Visionary Heads, pictures by William Blake) for piano (2013)
- Farewell. In Memory of Alexander Ivashkin. For solo cello (2014)
- Pro et contra, two pieces for viola and piano (2014)
- The Silly Moon, 8 haiku for voice and piano, text and music by Smirnov (2014)
- Solo for Viola (2014)
- The China Travel, 20 songs for voice and piano on poems by Olga Sedakova, composed with V. Gorodetskaya (2014)
- Four Eight-line Poems for voice and piano on poems by Sedakova (2014)

== Recordings ==
- Fish Ear FECD621. Peter Sheppard, Violin: Winter Journey / Smirnov: partita
- Megadisc MDC 7818. an Introduction to Dmitri Smirnov. Elegy, String of Destiny, Es ist…, Piano Trio 1, Cello sonata, Postlude
- Metier MSV CD92028. Peter Sheppard, Violin: Etude Philharmpnique / Smirnov: Two Fugues
- Mobile Fidelity MFCD 906. Works by Modern Composers of Moscow / Smirnov: Solo for Harp
- Olympia OCD 282. Moscow Contemporary Music Ensemble, Vol.2 / Smirnov: Sonata for fl and harp
- Conifer 75605 51252-2, reissued on RCA/Catalyst 82876 64283-2. Chilingirian Quartet / Smirnov: Second Quartet
- Vanguard Classics 99154. Aurelia Saxophone Quartet: Four generations of Russian composers / Smirnov: Fantasia (also on Challenge Classics CC 72039)
- Vanguard Classics 99212. Brodsky Quartet: Beethoven Op18 and six more / Smirnov: Quartet 6 (also reissued on Challenge Classics, CC 72009)
- NBE CD 021 Nederland Blazers Ensemble: La ligubre gondola & Legende No. 2 / Liszt/Smirnov
- Vista Vera VVCD-00232 by Lev Mikhailov and partners / Smirnov: Mirages for saxophone quartet
- Visto: 2121 CD – Proyecto Mockba / Smirnov: Serenade op. 34, para obeo, saxofón alto y violonchelo. Tiriel op. 41b, para saxofón barítono y piano
- Meridian CDE 84586: Primrose Piano Quartet / Smirnov Piano Quintet;
- Vivat: 109: Russian Émigrés – Alissa Firsova, piano / Smirnov: Sonata No. 6 "Blake Sonata", Op. 157 (2008)

== Bibliography ==
- A Geometer of Sound Crystals: A Book on Philip Herschkowitz. (Ernst Kuhn, Berlin 2003) ISBN 3-928864-99-8
- The Anatomy of Theme in Beethoven's Piano Sonatas. (Ernst Kuhn, Berlin 2008) ISBN 978-3-936637-19-9

== Sources ==
- Yuri Kholopov: Russians in England: Dmitri Smirnov, Elena Firsova. Article, in: Music From the Former USSR. Issue 2. Moscow: Composer, 1996, pp. 255–303 (in Russian); also in «Ex oriente...I» Ten Composers from the former USSR. Viktor Suslin, Dmitry Smirnov, Arvo Pärt, Yury Kasparov, Galina Ustvolskaya, Nikolai Sidelnikov, Elena Firsova Vladimir Martynov, Andrei Eshpai, Boris Chaikovsky. Edited by Valeria Tsenova (studia slavica musicologica, Bd. 25), Verlag Ernst Kuhn – Berlin. ISBN 3-928864-84-X pp. 207–266 (in English)
- Gerard McBurney: Dmitri Smirnov. Entry in Grove Dictionary of Music
