= The Book of Thel =

1789 poem by William Blake

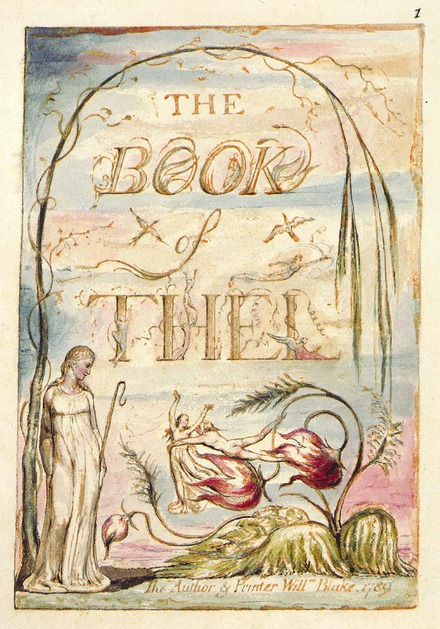
William Blake: The Book of Thel, copy O, plate 1. Copy O, in the collection of the Library of Congress, is one of the two 1815-18 printings of Thel; the other is Copy N, in the collection of the Cincinnati Art Museum.

The Book of Thel is a poem by William Blake, dated 1789 and probably composed in the period 1788 to 1790. It is illustrated by his own plates, and compared to his later prophetic books is relatively short and easier to understand. The metre is a fourteen-syllable line. It was preceded by Tiriel, which Blake left in manuscript. A few lines from Tiriel were incorporated into The Book of Thel. Most of the poem is in unrhymed verse.

This book consists of eight plates executed in illuminated printing. Sixteen copies of the original print of 1789–1793 are known. Three copies bearing a watermark of 1815 are more elaborately colored than the others.

== Thel's Motto ==
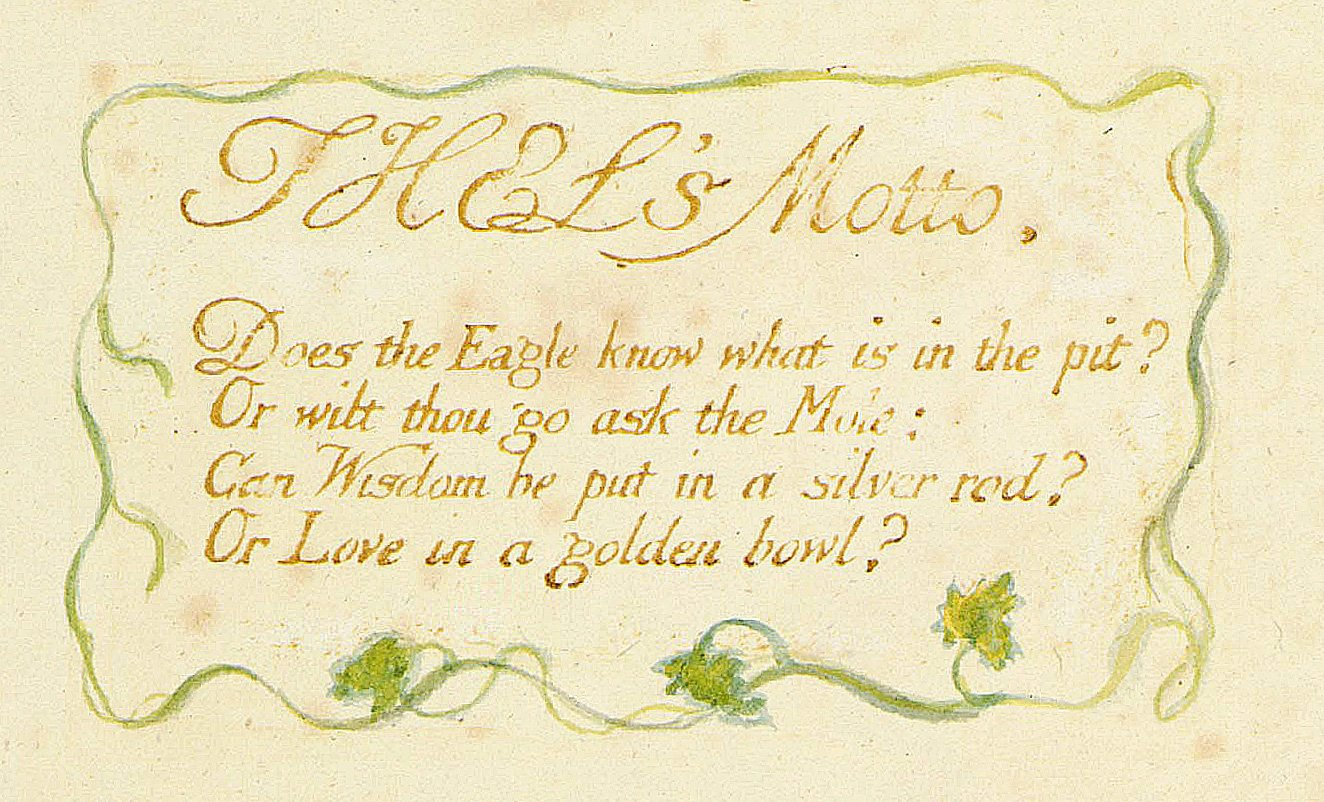
Plate 01 of the Book of Thel with Thel's Motto. This version of the image is from copy F currently held at the Library of Congress.

Does the Eagle know what is in the pit?
Or wilt thou go ask the Mole:
Can Wisdom be put in a silver rod?
Or Love in a golden bowl?

Thel’s Motto can be interpreted as Blake’s rejection of the Church of England. The “silver rod” where Wisdom cannot be found represents a scepter or staff that would have been used in traditional kingship or even high-ranking ecclesiasts before the rise of nationalism and the consequent fall of the papacy in the 16th and 17th centuries. The Motto goes on to express doubt that Love can be found in a “golden bowl.” The image of the golden bowl refers to a chalice that is raised when priests in the Christian tradition celebrate the Eucharist. The religious connotations of the rod and bowl help explain the disillusionment that many Romantic writers, notably William Blake, had with the state church. This type of theological alienation is consistent with the revolutionary and rebellious sentiments of the era. Another interpretation of the silver rod and the golden bowl are that of the male and female genitalia. Wisdom resides in the male organ and Love resides in the female organ. Should one accept this interpretation, the rod and bowl are transformed from an imperishable state to one of mortal flesh, and the reader acknowledges that a voice of authority is narrating the poem’s action. Blake inscribed the “Motto” plate after he had already composed the first five plates, and the dates suggest that the Motto plate and plate 6 were created at or near the same time. Since Thel’s Motto is clearly an afterthought to the Book, one can connect the final plate, plate 6, and Thel’s Motto. The connection between the mole’s pit and the subterranean area that Thel enters in plate 6 suggests the disparate knowledge between beings in separate domains. The eagle knows only the sky and must ask the mole to gain knowledge about the pit; likewise, Thel knows only innocence and eternity and must be endowed mortality if she wants to learn about the ways of the mortal beings on Earth.

== The first lines ==
The daughters of Mne Seraphim led round their sunny flocks.
All but the youngest; she in paleness sought the secret air.
To fade away like morning beauty from her mortal day:
Down by the river of Adona her soft voice is heard:
And thus her gentle lamentation falls like morning dew.

— Part 1, lines 1-5

== The story ==
The daughters of Mne Seraphim are all shepherdesses in the Vales of Har, apart from the youngest, Thel. She spends her time wandering on her own, trying to find the answer to the question that torments her: why does the springtime of life inevitably fade so that all things must end? She meets the Lilly of the Valley who tries to comfort her. When Thel remains uncomforted, the Lilly sends her on to ask the Cloud. The Cloud explains that he is part of a natural process and, although he sometimes disappears, he is never gone forever. Thel replies that she is not like the Cloud and when she disappears she will not return. So the Cloud suggests asking the same question of the Worm. The Worm is still a child and cannot answer. Instead it is the Worm’s mother, the Clod of Clay, who answers. The Clod explains that we do not live for ourselves, but for others. She invites Thel to enter into her underground realm and see the dark prison of the dead where Thel herself will one day reside. However, Thel is assailed by mysterious voices asking a whole series of yet more terrible questions about existence. Uttering a shriek, she flees back to her home in the Vales of Har. The pit represents sex and mortality of life, while the Vales of Har represent virginity and eternity. The first part of the poem shows the good part of life as in Songs of Innocence whereas the concluding part shows that life is full of sorrows where smiles are never seen, as in Songs of Experience.

The question is "Why do the physical senses darken the soul by excluding it from the wisdom and joy of eternity?"

Thel is the allegory of the unborn spirit who has gathered experience from her own discoveries and has decided to remain forever innocent.

== Innocence vs. Experience ==
In The Book of Thel, the Vales of Har are depicted as an edenic paradise that lived in harmony; a world where the rain feeds the flowers and the clod of clay feeds the infantile worm. The common belief in this world among the characters is that “everything that lives Lives not alone nor for itself.” Thel wishes to enter the world of experience and leave behind her innocent paradise. However, once Thel enters the world of experience, she cowers in terror at the thought of mortality and the uselessness of human beings if every action leads toward the grave. This can also be interpreted as Thel’s fear of losing innocence and virginity upon entering the world of adult sexuality. In other words, Thel’s fear of growing up is what keeps her from actually living. When she flees from the experienced world because it appears as her tombstone, she unwittingly flees life itself. William Blake has put a microscope on the conflict between innocence and experience and he has found that innocence must take on a more elevated meaning, one found through suffering, that Thel can never reach so long as she is gripped by her fear of opening herself up to risk. The idea that Thel’s future life was one of despair and death can be read as another example of Thel’s skewed perspective. Thel is surprised by her brilliance and says that the world of experience looks like a “chamber of horrors.” It has also been suggested that the Worm has a part in the conflict between innocence and experience. The Worm is speaking as a messenger for the world of experience, and his words are inaudible to Thel because the Worm is not a part of her realm. The Worm speaks of phallic sexuality and the guaranteed death of mortality. This creates a mediator when she gives the voice to the Clod of Clay. Now the Clod of Clay acts as an interface between innocence and experience. A visual criticism of Thel's fearful rejection of the natural progression from innocence to experience appears in the drawing containing the words "The End": children riding a serpent, a frequent iconographic symbol in Blake (cf. two instances in "Nurses Song," "Songs of Innocence").

== Quotations ==
- "The Book of Thel is an allegory of the unborn spirit visiting the world of generation. Thel rejects the self-sacrificing aspects of experience and flees back to eternity. The symbols of the Lily-of-the-Valley, the Cloud, the Worm and the Clod of Clay represent idealistic fancy, youth, adolescence and motherhood." —Geoffrey Keynes
- "The Book of Thel is best understood as a rewriting of Milton's Comus. ... Blake tells the same story, but in biological terms, not moral ones." —S. Foster Damon

== Trivia ==
- Metal singer Bruce Dickinson recorded an adaptation of this for his 1998 album "The Chemical Wedding".
- Lucien Posman has set 'The Book of Thel' to music (2001) ( a composition for mezzo-soprano or soprano, flute, clarinet, Glockenspiel, marimba, violin, viola, cello & piano)
- It is said to have influenced The Outcasts.

== See also ==
- William Blake's prophetic books
- Tiriel (poem)
- William Blake's mythology
- Thel (opera)
