= Jane W. Davidson =

Jane Davidson FAHA
- Born: Jane W. Davidson

Academic work
- Institutions: The University of Melbourne
- Main interests: Music psychology
- Website: http://vca-mcm.unimelb.edu.au/staff/janedavidson

Jane Davidson FAHA is Professor of Creative and Performing Arts (Music) at The University of Melbourne and deputy director of the Australian Research Council's Centre of Excellence for the History of Emotions.

== Early life ==
She began her academic career in 1991, initially as a postdoctoral research fellow at Keele University, Staffordshire, then as lecturer in music at City University, London. From 1995 to 2006 she worked through the ranks from lecturer to full professor at the University of Sheffield. In the UK, she also taught on a sessional basis at the Guildhall School of Music and Drama in London. She moved to Australia as the inaugural Callaway/Tunley Chair of Music at the University of Western Australia (UWA) and worked there from 2006 to 2013.

== Later career ==
Davidson has a number of study interests: artistic development, arts and health, performance practices, emotion and expression in performance, and vocal studies. She has published extensively, researching in the disciplines of music psychology and education, and works in the history of emotions. She has been the successful recipient of research grants internationally, and is a frequent reviewer for academic funding bodies and publishers.

She was Editor of Psychology of Music (1997–2001); Vice-president of the European Society for the Cognitive Sciences of Music (2003–2006); and President of the Musicological Society of Australia (2010 and 2011). She also completed service working as a member of the Research Evaluation Committee for Excellence in Research in Australia (ERA) for both the trial evaluation in 2009 and main assessment in 2012.

As a practitioner, she has worked as an opera singer and music theatre director. She continued her practical work in voice at UWA, coordinating the voice department and offering a range of repertoire classes and staged productions. She currently supervises postgraduate singers, alongside a range of performers, teachers, and scholars in the fields of music psychology and musicology.

She was elected a Fellow of the Australian Academy of the Humanities in 2021.
