= S. Foster Damon =

American poet

Samuel Foster Damon (February 12, 1893 – December 25, 1971) was an American academic, a specialist in William Blake, a critic and a poet. When remembered as a Blake scholar, he is often compared in importance to Northrop Frye and David V. Erdman.

== Early life ==
He was born in Newton, Massachusetts. He graduated from Harvard University in 1914, returning there after World War I as an instructor in the English Department. He was one of the Harvard Aesthetes, and married Louise Wheelwright, sister of John Brooks Wheelwright, another active Harvard Aesthete.

== Scholarly career ==
His book William Blake, His Philosophy and Symbols from 1924 was later followed by A Blake Dictionary (1965), the work for which he is perhaps best known. Their encyclopedic scope expanded Blake studies into the examination of the mystical and occult elements of Blake's work. In the foreword to a revised edition of the Dictionary, Morris Eaves says that when Damon's first book on Blake came out, he was the "Young Turk" of Blake studies, and when the Dictionary appeared, he was the "patriarch" of the field.

His later academic career was at Brown University, where he had positions from 1927. His other writings include a biography of Amy Lowell, and the long poem The Moulton Tragedy, a heroic poem with lyrics (1971). He also published poetry under the pseudonym Samuel Nomad.
