= William Blake =

English poet and artist (1757–1827)

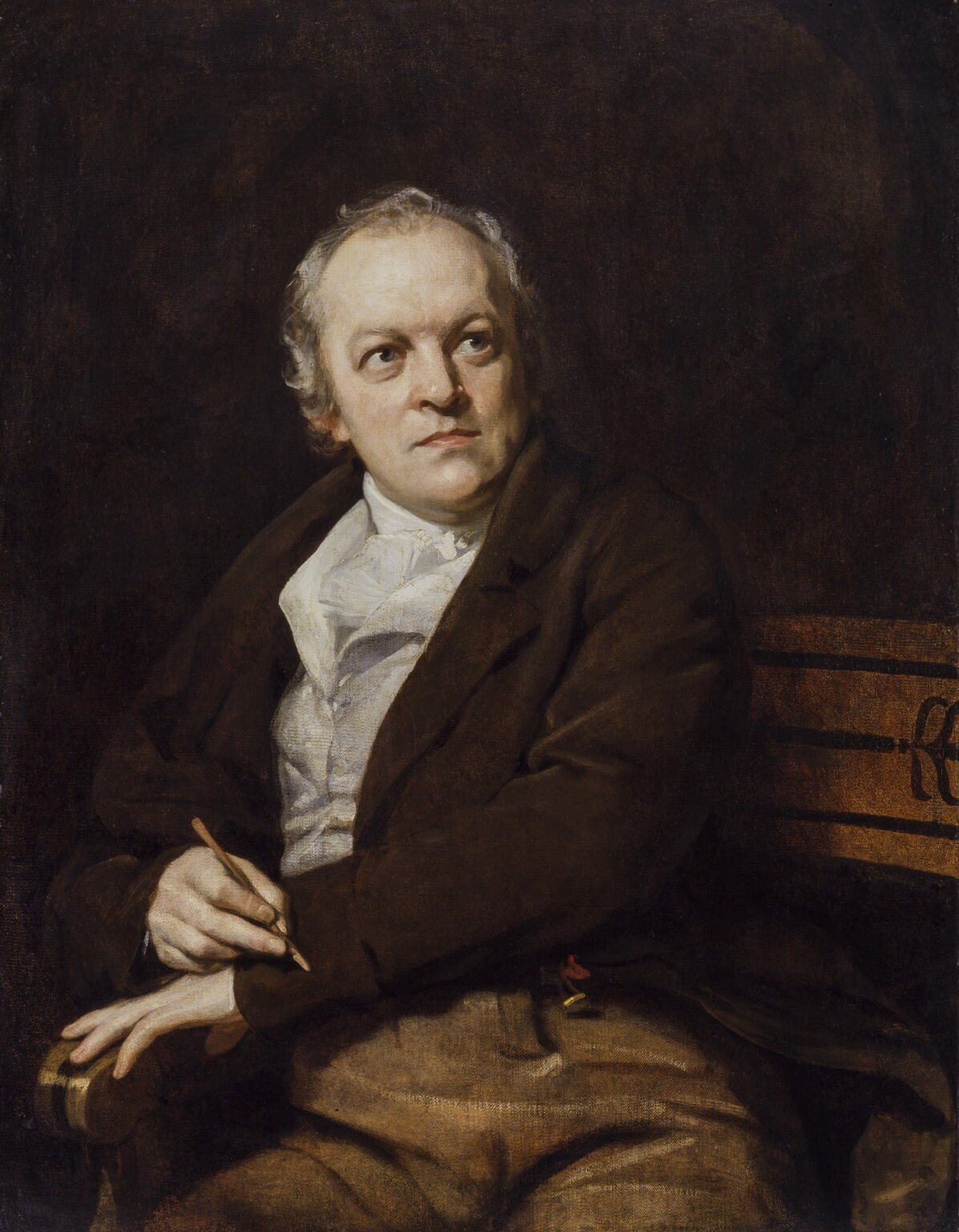
- Portrait of William Blake by Thomas Phillips, 1807
- Born: 28 November 1757; Soho, London, England
- Died: 12 August 1827 (aged 69); Charing Cross, London, England
- Education: Royal Academy of Arts
- Occupations: Poet; painter; printmaker
- Spouse: Catherine Boucher (m. 1782)
- Writing career
- Language: English
- Notable works: Songs of Innocence and of Experience (1794), William Blake's prophetic books (1789–1820)
- Movement: Romanticism

William Blake (28 November 1757 – 12 August 1827) was an English poet, painter and printmaker. Largely unrecognised during his life, Blake has become a seminal figure in the history of the poetry and visual art of the Romantic Age. What he called his "prophetic works" were said by the 20th-century critic Northrop Frye to form "what is in proportion to its merits the least read body of poetry in the [English] language". While he lived in London his entire life, except for three years spent in Felpham, he produced a diverse and symbolically rich collection of works, which embraced the imagination as "the body of God", or "human existence itself".

Although Blake was considered mad by contemporaries for his idiosyncratic views, he came to be highly regarded by later critics and readers for his expressiveness and creativity, and for the philosophical and mystical undercurrents within his work. His paintings and poetry have been characterised as part of the Romantic movement and as "Pre-Romantic". He was hostile to the Church of England (indeed, to almost all forms of organised religion), and was influenced by the ideals and ambitions of the French and American Revolutions. Although later he rejected many of these political beliefs, he maintained an amicable relationship with the political activist Thomas Paine; he was also influenced by thinkers such as Emanuel Swedenborg. Despite these known influences, the singularity of Blake's work makes him difficult to classify. The 19th-century scholar William Michael Rossetti characterised him as a "glorious luminary", and "a man not forestalled by predecessors, nor to be classed with contemporaries, nor to be replaced by known or readily surmisable successors".

Collaboration with his wife, Catherine Boucher, was instrumental in the creation of many of his books. Boucher worked as a printmaker and colourist for his works. "For almost forty-five years she was the person who lived and worked most closely with Blake, enabling him to realize numerous projects, impossible without her assistance. Catherine was an artist and printer in her own right," writes the literary scholar Angus Whitehead.

== Early life ==
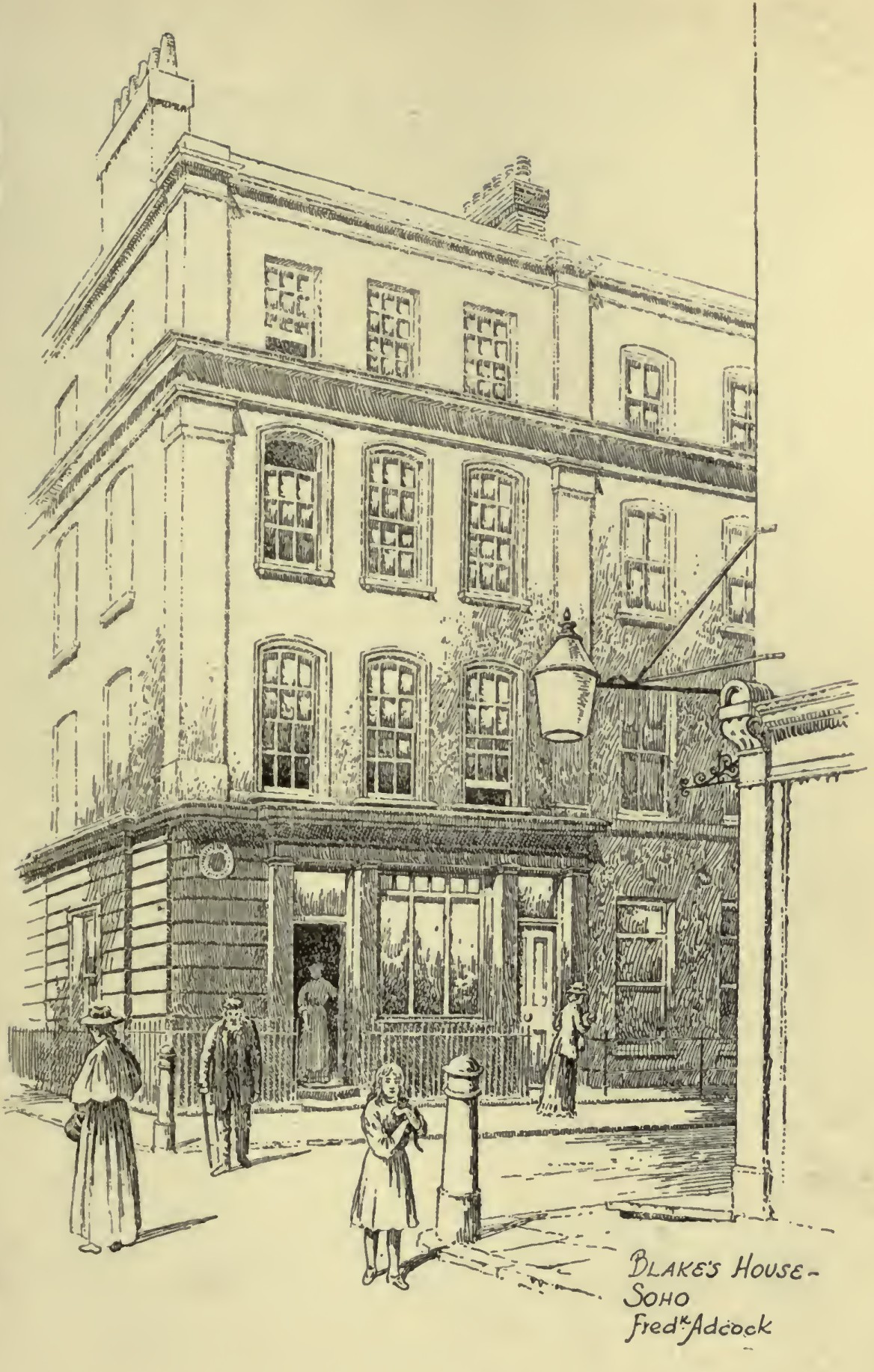
28 Broad Street (now Broadwick Street) in an illustration of 1912. Blake was born here and lived here until he was 25. The house was demolished in 1965.

William Blake was born on 28 November 1757 at 28 Broad Street (now Broadwick Street) in Soho, London. He was the third of seven children, two of whom died in infancy. Blake's father, James, was a hosier, who had lived in London. William attended school only long enough to learn reading and writing, leaving at the age of 10, and was otherwise educated at home by his mother Catherine Blake (née Wright). Even though the Blakes were Moravians and English Dissenters, William was baptised on 11 December at St James's Church, Piccadilly, London. The Bible was an early and profound influence on Blake, and remained a source of inspiration throughout his life. Blake's childhood, according to him, included mystical religious experiences such as "beholding God's face pressed against his window, seeing angels among the haystacks, and being visited by the Old Testament prophet Ezekiel."

More than original designs, the young Blake liked engraving copies of drawings of Greek antiquities purchased for him by his father. In these drawings Blake found his first exposure to classical forms through the work of Raphael, Michelangelo, Maarten van Heemskerck and Albrecht Dürer. The number of prints and bound books that James and Catherine were able to purchase for young William suggests that the Blakes enjoyed, at least for a time, a comfortable wealth. When William was ten years old, his parents knew enough of his headstrong temperament that he was not sent to school but instead enrolled in drawing classes at Henry Pars's drawing school in the Strand. He read avidly on subjects of his own choosing. During this period, Blake made explorations into poetry; his early work displays knowledge of Ben Jonson, Edmund Spenser and the Psalms.

=== Apprenticeship ===
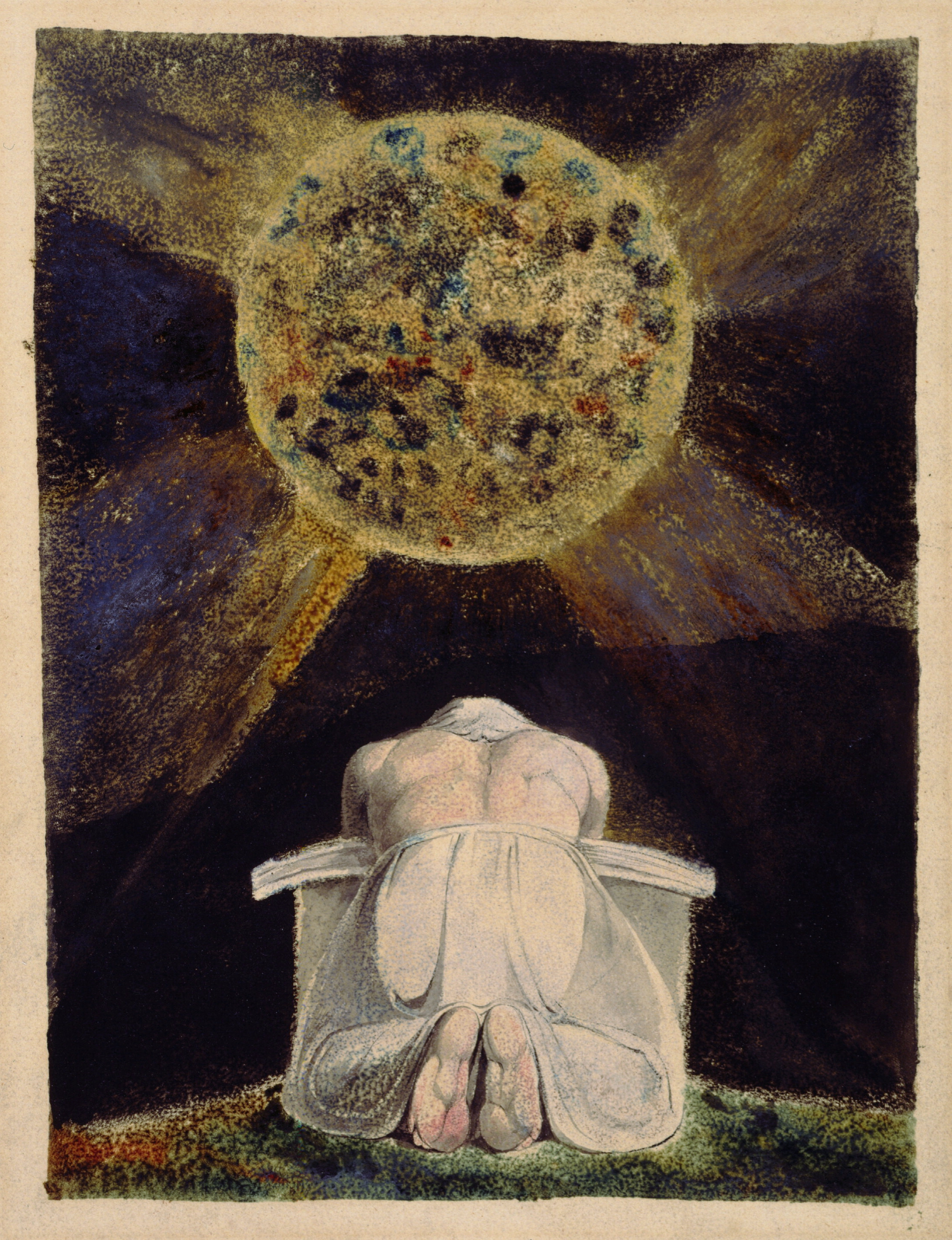
The archetype of the Creator is a familiar image in Blake's work. Here, the demiurgic figure Urizen prays before the world he has forged. The Song of Los is the third in a series of illuminated books painted by Blake and his wife, collectively known as the Continental Prophecies.

On 4 August 1772 Blake was apprenticed to the engraver James Basire of Great Queen Street, at the sum of £52.10, for a term of seven years. At the end of the term, aged 21, he became a professional engraver. No record survives of any serious disagreement or conflict between the two during the period of Blake's apprenticeship, but Peter Ackroyd's biography notes that Blake later added Basire's name to a list of artistic adversaries; and then crossed it out. This aside, Basire's style of line-engraving was of a kind held at the time to be old-fashioned compared to the flashier stipple or mezzotint styles. It has been speculated that Blake's instruction in this outmoded form may have been detrimental to his acquiring work or recognition in later life.

After two years, Basire sent his apprentice to copy images from the Gothic churches in London (perhaps to settle a quarrel between Blake and James Parker, his fellow apprentice). His experiences in Westminster Abbey helped form his artistic style and ideas. The Abbey in his day was decorated with suits of armour, painted funeral effigies and varicoloured waxworks. Ackroyd notes that "the most immediate [impression] would have been of faded brightness and colour". This close study of the Gothic (which he saw as the "living form") left clear traces in his style. In the long afternoons Blake spent sketching in the Abbey, he was occasionally interrupted by boys from Westminster School, who were allowed in the Abbey. They teased him and one tormented him so much that Blake knocked the boy off a scaffold to the ground, "upon which he fell with terrific Violence". After Blake complained to the Dean, the schoolboys' privilege was withdrawn. Blake claimed that he experienced visions in the Abbey. He saw Christ with his Apostles and a great procession of monks and priests, and heard their chant.

=== Royal Academy ===
On 8 October 1779, Blake became a student at the Royal Academy in Old Somerset House, near the Strand. While the terms of his study required no payment, he was expected to supply his own materials throughout the six-year period. There, he rebelled against what he regarded as the unfinished style of fashionable painters such as Peter Paul Rubens, championed by the school's first president, Joshua Reynolds. Over time, Blake came to detest Reynolds' attitude towards art, especially his pursuit of "general truth" and "general beauty". Reynolds wrote in his Discourses that the "disposition to abstractions, to generalising and classification, is the great glory of the human mind"; Blake responded, in marginalia to his personal copy, that "To Generalize is to be an Idiot; To Particularize is the Alone Distinction of Merit". Blake also disliked Reynolds' apparent humility, which he held to be a form of hypocrisy. Against Reynolds' fashionable oil painting, Blake preferred the Classical precision of his early influences Michelangelo and Raphael.

David Bindman suggests that Blake's antagonism towards Reynolds arose not so much from the president's opinions (like Blake, Reynolds held history painting to be of greater value than landscape and portraiture), but rather "against his hypocrisy in not putting his ideals into practice". Certainly Blake was not averse to exhibiting at the Royal Academy, submitting works on six occasions between 1780 and 1808.

Blake became a friend of John Flaxman, Thomas Stothard and George Cumberland during his first year at the Royal Academy. They shared radical views, with Stothard and Cumberland joining the Society for Constitutional Information.

=== Gordon Riots ===
Blake's first biographer, Alexander Gilchrist, records that in June 1780 Blake was walking towards Basire's shop in Great Queen Street when he was swept up by a rampaging mob that stormed Newgate Prison. The mob attacked the prison gates with shovels and pickaxes, set the building ablaze, and released the prisoners inside. Blake was reportedly in the front rank of the mob during the attack. The riots, in response to a parliamentary bill revoking sanctions against Roman Catholicism, became known as the Gordon Riots and provoked a flurry of legislation from the government of George III, and the creation of the first police force.

=== Marriage and collaboration with Catherine Boucher ===
In 1781 Blake met Catherine Boucher when he was recovering from a relationship that had culminated in a refusal of his marriage proposal. He recounted the story of his heartbreak for Catherine and her parents, after which he asked Catherine: "Do you pity me?" When she responded affirmatively, he declared: "Then I love you". William married Catherine, who was five years his junior, on 18 August 1782 in St Mary's Church, Battersea. Illiterate, Catherine signed her wedding contract with an X. The original wedding certificate may be viewed at the church, where a commemorative stained-glass window was installed between 1976 and 1982. The marriage was successful and Catherine became William's "partner in both life and work", undertaking important roles as an engraver and colourist. According to the Tate Gallery, Catherine mixed and applied his paint colours. One of Catherine Blake's most noted works is the colouring of the cover of the book Europe: A Prophecy. William Blake's 1863 biographer, Alexander Gilchrist, wrote, "The poet and his wife did everything in making the book – writing, designing, printing, engraving – everything except manufacturing the paper: the very ink, or colour rather, they did make." In 2019 Tate Britain's Blake exhibition gave particular focus to Catherine's role in Blake's work.

== Career ==
=== Early work ===
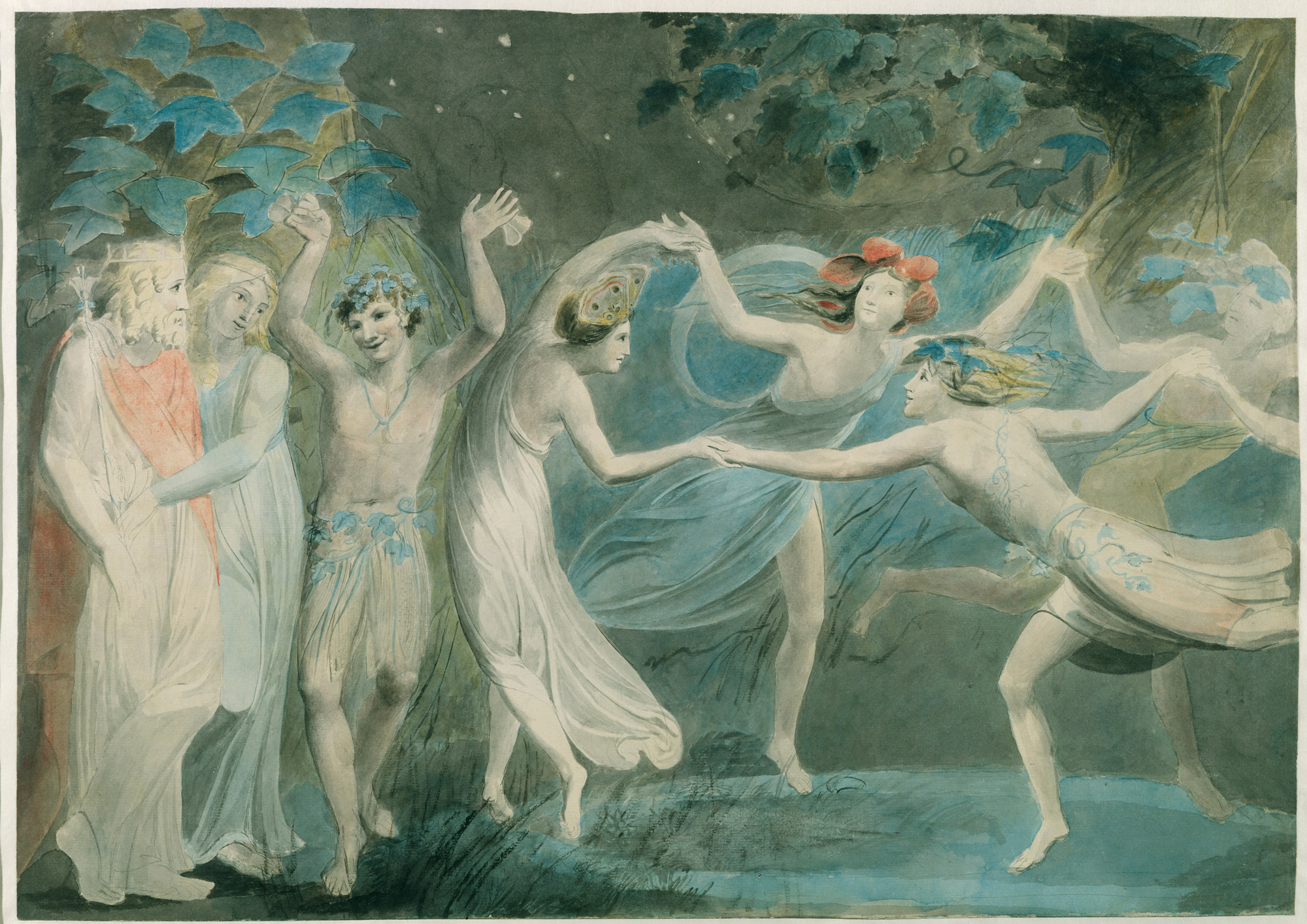
Oberon, Titania and Puck with Fairies Dancing (1786)

Around 1783, Blake performed his juvenile verse at a dinner party, resulting in patronage and funding for the publication of his first collection of poems, Poetical Sketches. In 1784, after his father's death, Blake and his former fellow apprentice James Parker opened a print shop. They began working with the radical publisher Joseph Johnson and became tangential members of his radical circle. Johnson's house was a meeting-place for some leading English intellectual dissidents of the time: the theologian and scientist Joseph Priestley; the philosopher Richard Price; the artist John Henry Fuseli; the early feminist Mary Wollstonecraft; and the English-American revolutionary Thomas Paine. Along with William Wordsworth and William Godwin, Blake had great hopes for the French and American revolutions and allegedly wore a Phrygian cap in solidarity with the French revolutionaries, but despaired with the rise of Maximilien Robespierre and the Reign of Terror in France. That same year, Blake composed his unfinished manuscript An Island in the Moon (1784).

Blake illustrated Original Stories from Real Life (2nd edition, 1791) by Wollstonecraft. Although they seem to have shared some views on sexual equality and the institution of marriage, no evidence is known that would prove that they had met. In Visions of the Daughters of Albion (1793), Blake condemned the cruel absurdity of enforced chastity and marriage without love and defended the right of women to complete self-fulfilment.

From 1790 to 1800, William Blake lived in North Lambeth, London, at 13 Hercules Buildings, Hercules Road. The property was demolished in 1918, but the site is marked with a plaque. A series of 70 mosaics commemorates Blake in the nearby railway tunnels of Waterloo Station. The mosaics largely reproduce illustrations from Blake's illuminated books, The Songs of Innocence and of Experience, The Marriage of Heaven and Hell, and the prophetic books.

=== Relief etching ===
In 1788, aged 31, Blake invented the method of relief etching, a method he used to produce most of his subsequent books, paintings, pamphlets and poems. Relief etching, or illuminated printing, reverse engineers the medieval division of labor into scribes and illustrators. Using malleable copper plates, Blake would inscribe his designs backwards in acid-resistant ink (stopping up varnish), tracing both the words of the poem and their attendant images. Illustrations could appear alongside words in the manner of earlier illuminated manuscripts. Blake would then mold wax around the edges of his small copper plate, creating a mini-tub on which nitric acid could sit. The varnish would act as a protective layer, allowing the acid to bite through the rest of the plate, creating indentations and allowing the protected areas to rise up, standing in relief (hence the name), or as Blake describes it, "melting apparent surfaces away, and displaying the infinite which was hid" (MHH).

After the plate was etched, Blake could use a dauber (ink ball) to repetitively and meticulously apply ink to the areas he desired. Blake also mixed his own pigments, using linseed oil as a base and further using eight different powders to create his vibrant variety of hues. This method lightly applies the ink to the plate, reducing the chance that ink would seep into the lower acidified valleys, smudged, or splattered. He then would use cotton to dry out any splatters or smudges that snuck through the process, taking more time to clean up his inking than to ink it in the first place. Depending on the color and type of ink, Blake was more or less precise in this process. For example, the orange pigments used in later editions of The Songs of Innocence and of Experience blended in well with the copper plate, leaving more splatters.

In this way, Blake eliminated the need for two different printing presses, one which would print the text through one side of the paper, and a second which would print the image on the other. Scholars Joseph Viscomi and Michael Philips disagree on whether Blake inked the text and the image together, or did two separate pressings. The copy of EUROPE a PROPHECY (1794) housed in the Glasgow University Archives displays a printing error in which some of the text on plate 13 is obscured by the image. This, for Phillips, suggests that Blake mis-measured the distances in a two-step process, though does not mean that Blake always used a two-step process for all of his illuminated printing.

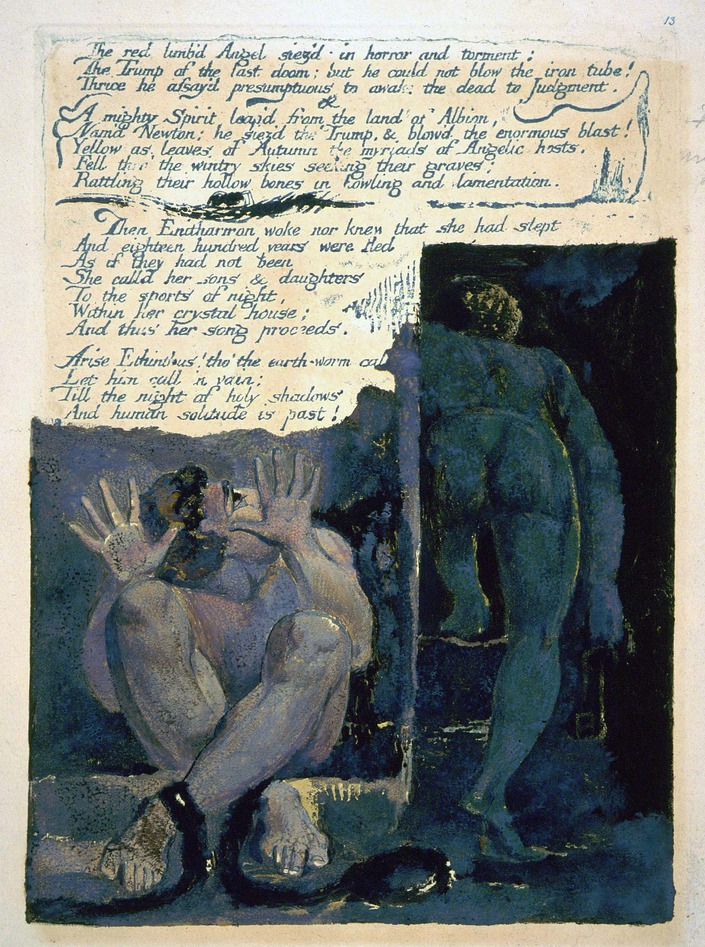
Detail of printing error on E13 of EUROPE a PROPHECY

This is a reversal of the usual method of etching, where the lines of the design are etched into the plate, exposed to the acid, and the plate printed by the intaglio method. Relief etching (which Blake referred to as "stereotype" in The Ghost of Abel) was intended as a means for producing his illuminated books more quickly than intaglio. Stereotype, a process invented in 1725, consisted of making a metal cast from a wood engraving, but Blake's innovation was, as described above, very different. The pages printed from these plates were hand-coloured in watercolours and stitched together to form a volume. Blake used illuminated printing for most of his well-known works, including Songs of Innocence and of Experience, The Book of Thel, The Marriage of Heaven and Hell and Jerusalem.

=== Engravings ===
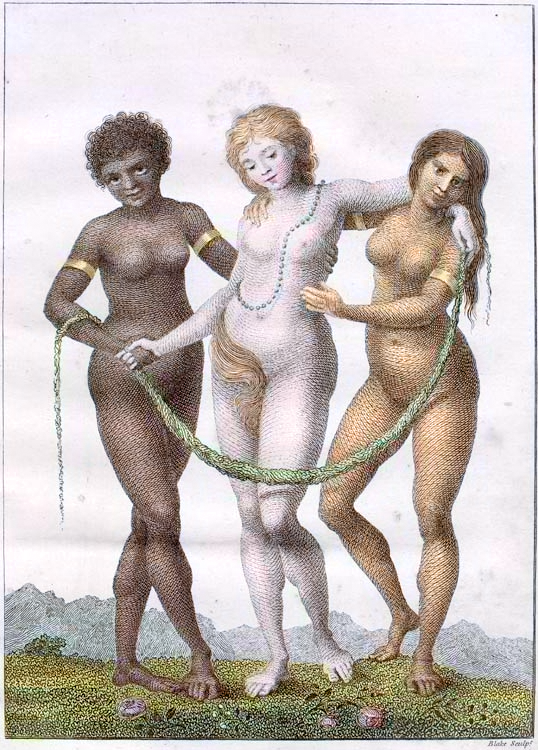
Europe Supported by Africa and America engraving by William Blake

Although Blake has become better known for his relief etching, his commercial work largely consisted of intaglio engraving, the standard process of engraving in the 18th century in which the artist incised an image into the copper plate, a complex and laborious process, with plates taking months or years to complete, but as Blake's contemporary John Boydell realised, such engraving offered a "missing link with commerce", enabling artists to connect with a mass audience and became an immensely important activity by the end of the 18th century.

Europe Supported by Africa and America is an engraving by Blake held in the collection of the University of Arizona Museum of Art. The engraving was for a book written by Blake's friend John Gabriel Stedman called The Narrative of a Five Years Expedition against the Revolted Negroes of Surinam (1796). It depicts three women embracing one another. Black Africa and White Europe hold hands in a gesture of equality, as the barren earth blooms beneath their feet. Europe wears a string of pearls, while her sisters Africa and America are depicted wearing slave bracelets. Some scholars have speculated that the bracelets represent the "historical fact" of slavery in Africa and the Americas while the handclasp refer to Stedman's "ardent wish": "we only differ in color, but are certainly all created by the same Hand." Others have said it "expresses the climate of opinion in which the questions of color and slavery were, at that time, being considered, and which Blake's writings reflect."

Blake employed intaglio engraving in his own work, such as for his Illustrations of the Book of Job, completed just before his death. Most critical work has concentrated on Blake's relief etching as a technique because it is the most innovative aspect of his art, but a 2009 study drew attention to Blake's surviving plates, including those for the Book of Job: they demonstrate that he made frequent use of a technique known as "repoussage", a means of obliterating mistakes by hammering them out by hitting the back of the plate. Such techniques, typical of engraving work of the time, are very different from the much faster and fluid way of drawing on a plate that Blake employed for his relief etching, and indicates why the engravings took so long to complete.

== Later life ==
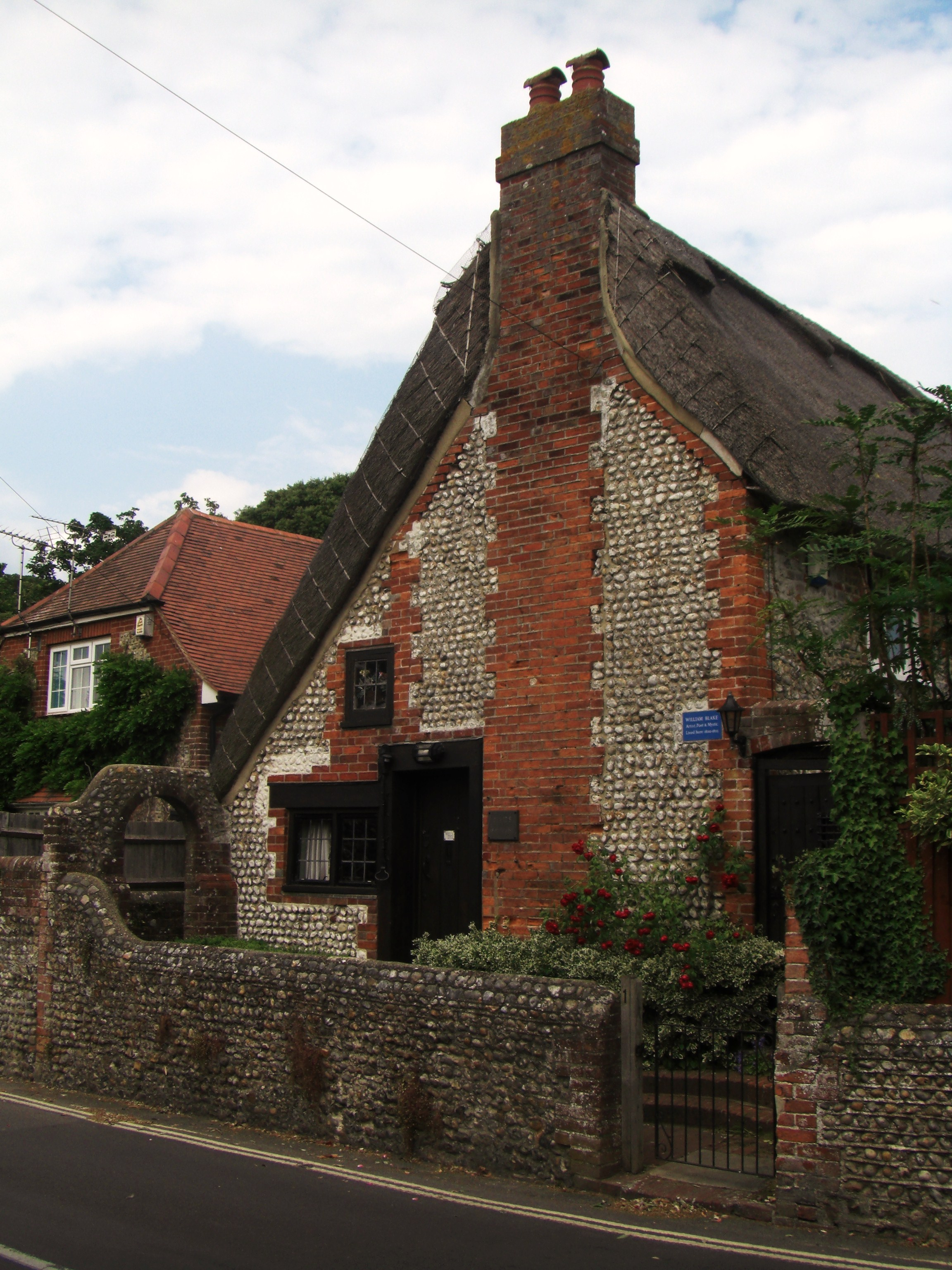
The cottage in Felpham, Blake’s Cottage, where Blake lived from 1800 until 1803

Blake's marriage to Catherine Boucher was close and devoted until his death. Blake taught Boucher to write, and she helped him colour his printed poems as a printing devil. Gilchrist refers to "stormy times" in the early years of the marriage, and as Morton Paley reports, there was tension between Boucher and Blake's brother Robert. During one especially intense argument, Boucher forced Blake to choose between herself and Robert. Choosing Robert, Blake had Boucher kneel and apologize to him for the inconvenience. Some biographers have suggested that Blake tried to bring a concubine into the marriage bed in accordance with the beliefs of the more radical branches of the Swedenborgian Society, but other scholars have dismissed these theories as conjecture. In his Dictionary, Samuel Foster Damon suggests that Catherine may have had a stillborn daughter for which The Book of Thel is an elegy. That is how he rationalises the book's unusual ending, but notes that he is speculating.

=== Felpham ===
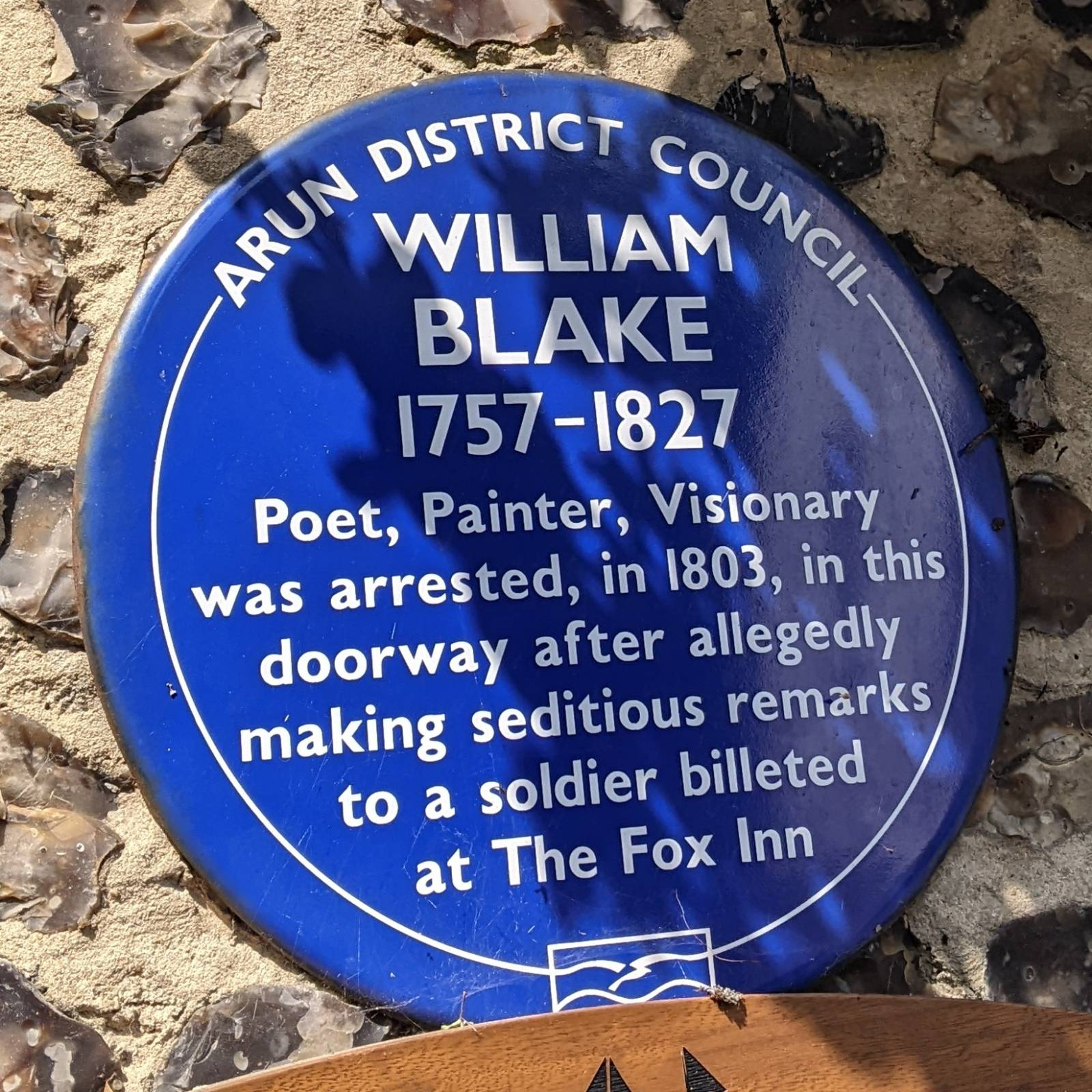
A memorial plaque outside of The Fox Inn in Felpham describing Blake's arrest.

In 1800, Blake moved to a cottage at Felpham, in Sussex (now West Sussex), to take up a job illustrating the works of William Hayley, a minor poet. It was in this cottage that Blake began Milton (the title page is dated 1804, but Blake continued to work on it until 1808). The preface to this work includes a poem beginning "And did those feet in ancient time", which became the words for the anthem "Jerusalem". Over time, Blake began to resent his new patron, believing that Hayley was uninterested in true artistry, and preoccupied with "the meer drudgery of business" (E724). Blake's disenchantment with Hayley has been speculated to have influenced Milton: a Poem, in which Blake wrote that "Corporeal Friends are Spiritual Enemies". (4:26, E98)

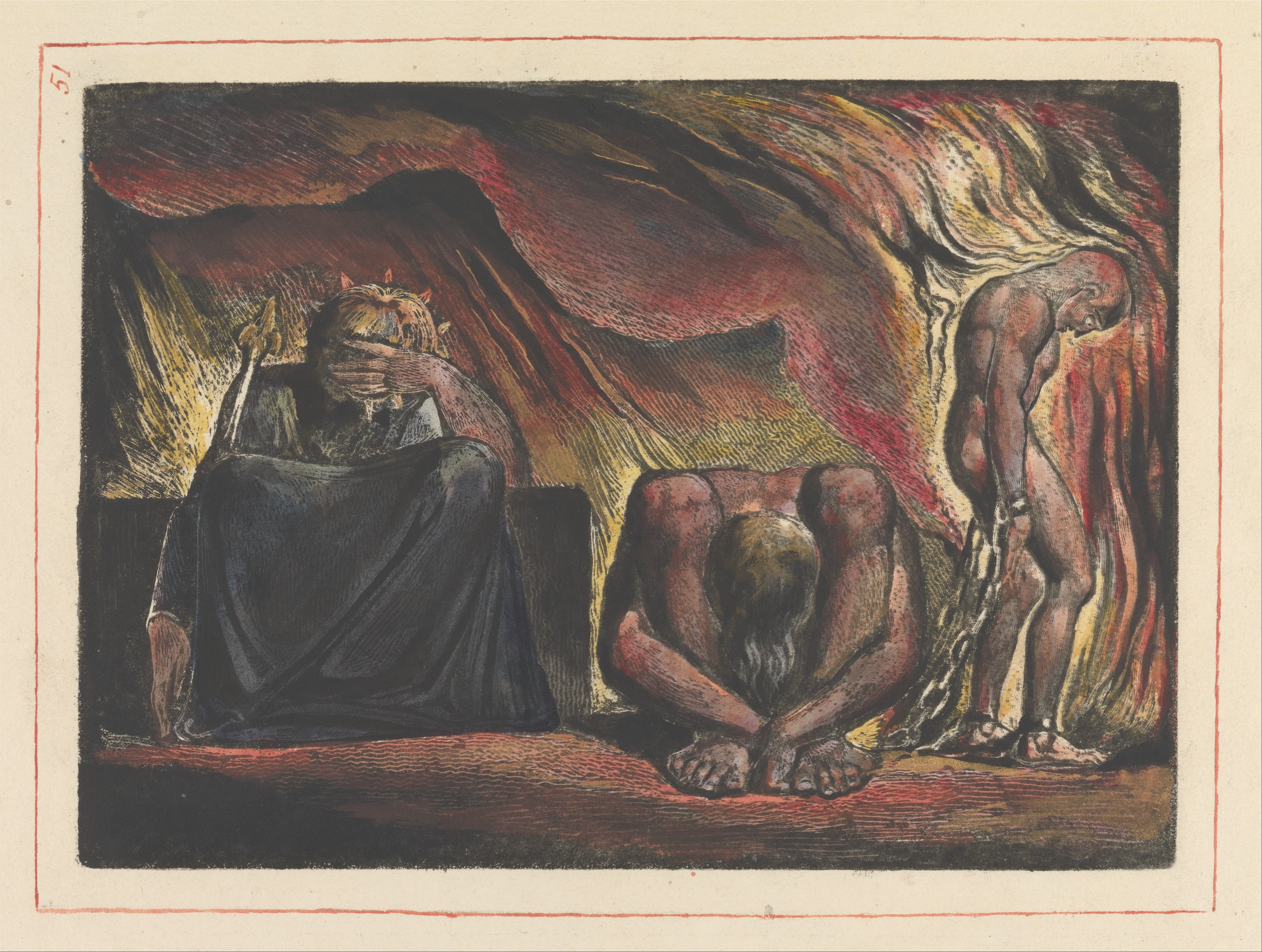
'Skofeld' wearing "mind forged manacles" in Jerusalem: The Emanation of the Giant Albion, Plate 51

Blake's trouble with authority came to a head in August 1803, when he was involved in a physical altercation with a soldier, John Schofield. Blake was charged not only with assault, but with uttering seditious and treasonable expressions against the King. Schofield claimed that Blake had exclaimed "Damn the king. The soldiers are all slaves." Blake was cleared in the Chichester assizes of the charges. According to a report in the Sussex county paper, "[T]he invented character of [the evidence] was ... so obvious that an acquittal resulted". Schofield was later depicted wearing "mind forged manacles" in an illustration to Jerusalem The Emanation of the Giant Albion.

=== Return to London ===
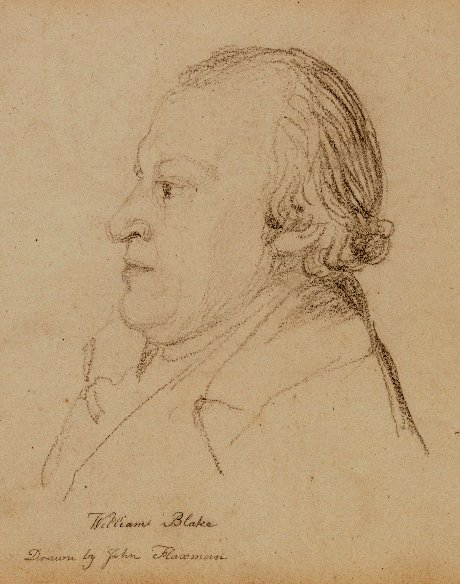
Sketch of Blake from, c. 1804, by John Flaxman

Blake returned to London in 1804 and began to write and illustrate Jerusalem (1804–20), his most ambitious work. Having conceived the idea of portraying the characters in Geoffrey Chaucer's Canterbury Tales, Blake approached the dealer Robert Cromek, with a view to marketing an engraving. Knowing Blake was too eccentric to produce a popular work, Cromek promptly commissioned Blake's friend Thomas Stothard to execute the concept. When Blake learned he had been cheated, he broke off contact with Stothard. He set up an independent exhibition in his brother's haberdashery shop at 27 Broad Street in Soho. The exhibition was designed to market his own version of the Canterbury illustration (titled The Canterbury Pilgrims), along with other works. As a result, he wrote his Descriptive Catalogue (1809), which contains what Anthony Blunt called a "brilliant analysis" of Chaucer and is regularly anthologised as a classic of Chaucer criticism. It also contained detailed explanations of his other paintings. The exhibition was very poorly attended, selling none of the temperas or watercolours. Its only review, in The Examiner, was hostile.

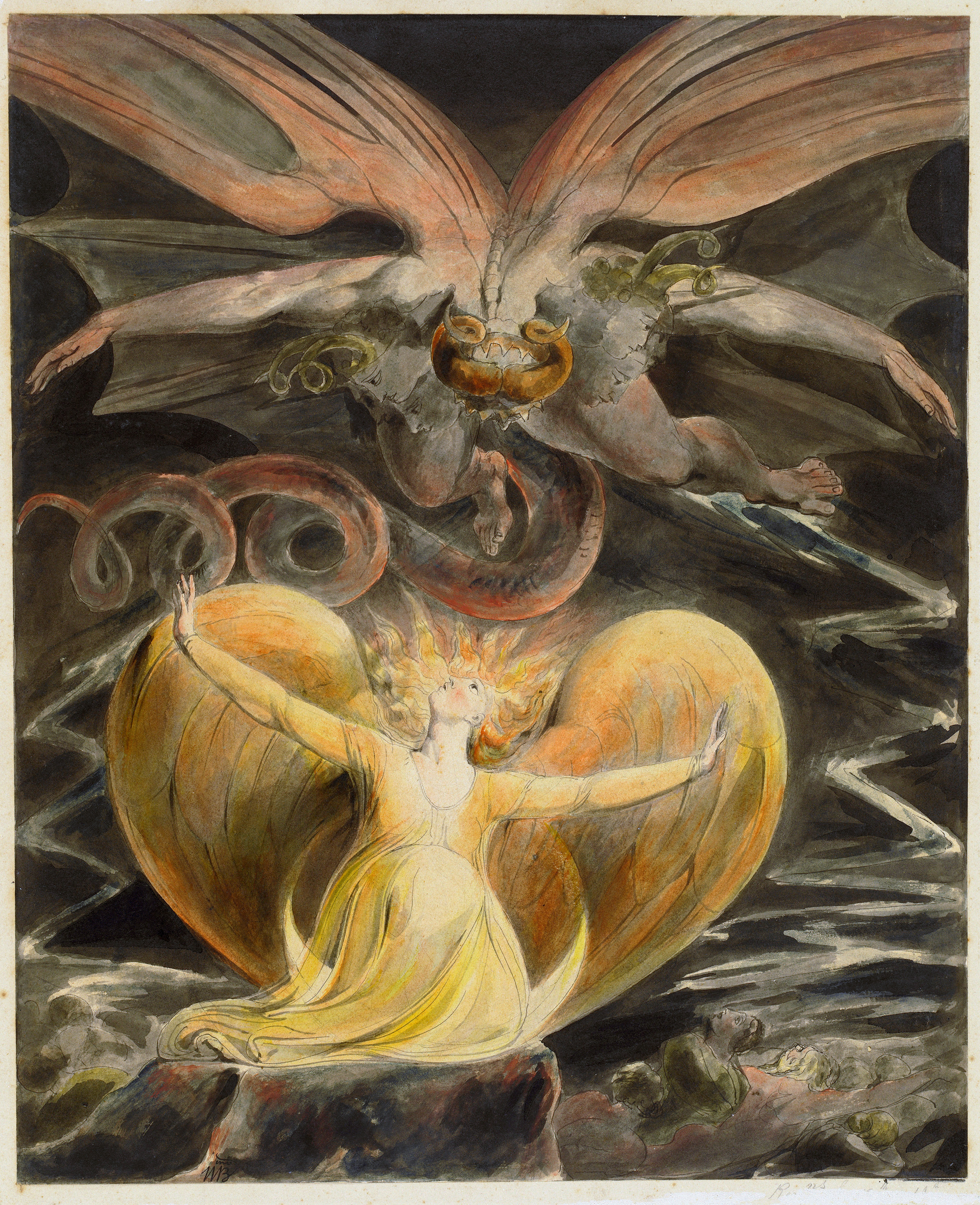
Blake's The Great Red Dragon and the Woman Clothed with Sun (1805) is one of a series of illustrations of Revelation 12.

Also around this time (circa 1808), Blake gave vigorous expression of his views on art in an extensive series of polemical annotations to the Discourses of Sir Joshua Reynolds, denouncing the Royal Academy as a fraud and proclaiming, "To Generalize is to be an Idiot".

In 1818 he was introduced by George Cumberland's son to a young artist named John Linnell. A blue plaque commemorates Blake and Linnell at Old Wyldes' at North End, Hampstead. Through Linnell he met Samuel Palmer, who belonged to a group of artists who called themselves the Shoreham Ancients. The group shared Blake's rejection of modern trends and his belief in a spiritual and artistic New Age. Aged 65, Blake began work on illustrations for the Book of Job, later admired by John Ruskin, who compared Blake favourably to Rembrandt, and by Vaughan Williams, who based his ballet Job: A Masque for Dancing on a selection of the illustrations.

In later life Blake began to sell a great number of his works, particularly his Bible illustrations, to Thomas Butts, a patron who saw Blake more as a friend than a man whose work held artistic merit; this was typical of the opinions held of Blake throughout his life.

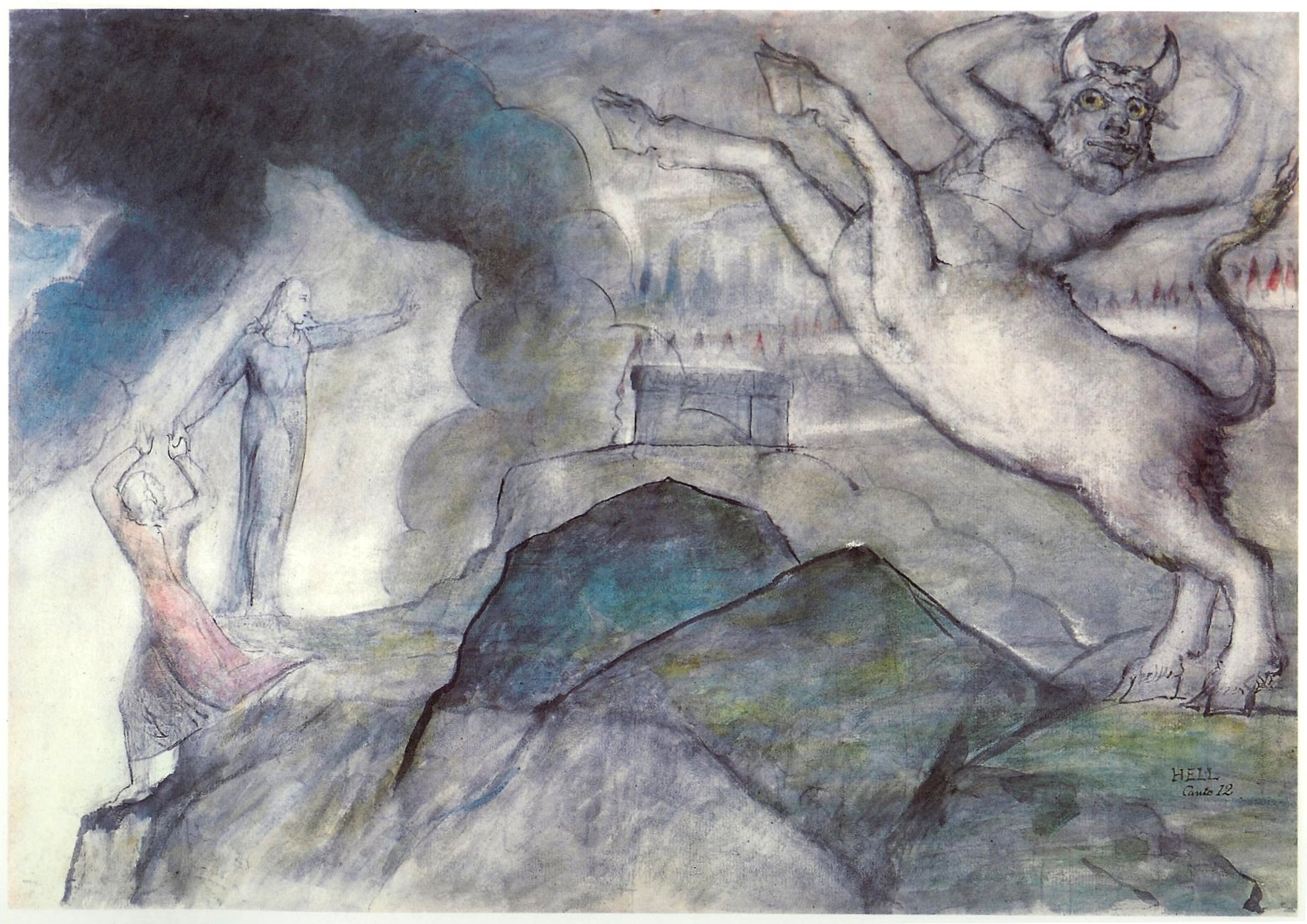
Blake's image of the Minotaur to illustrate Inferno, Canto XII, 12–28, The Minotaur XII.

The commission for Dante Alighieri's Divine Comedy came to Blake in 1826 through Linnell, with the aim of producing a series of engravings. Blake's death in 1827 cut short the enterprise, and only a handful of watercolours were completed, with only seven of the engravings arriving at proof form. Even so, they have earned praise:

[T]he Dante watercolours are among Blake's richest achievements, engaging fully with the problem of illustrating a poem of this complexity. The mastery of watercolour has reached an even higher level than before, and is used to extraordinary effect in differentiating the atmosphere of the three states of being in the poem.

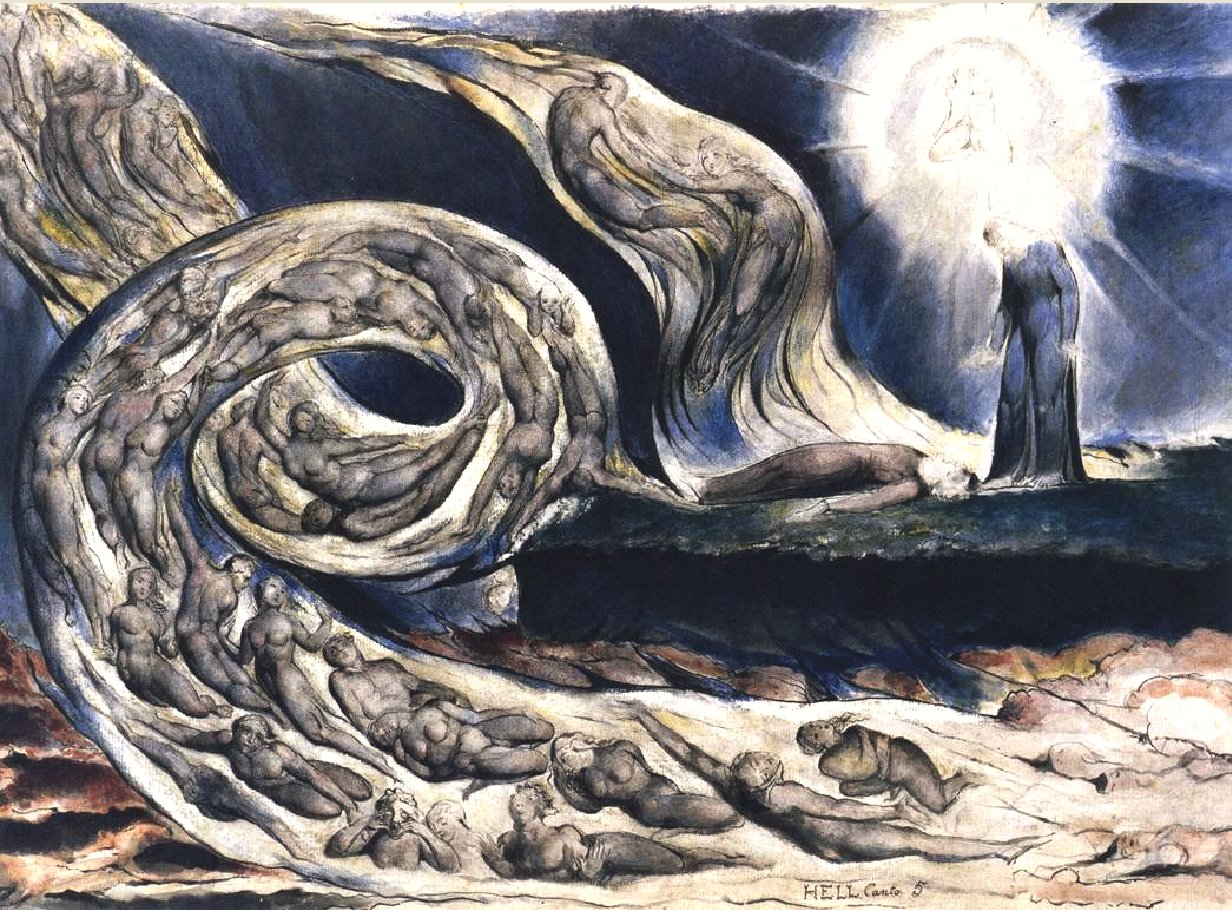
Blake's The Lovers' Whirlwind illustrates Hell in Canto V of Dante's Inferno.

Blake's illustrations of the poem are not merely accompanying works, but rather seem to critically revise, or furnish commentary on, certain spiritual or moral aspects of the text.

Because the project was never completed, Blake's intent may be obscured. Some indicators bolster the impression that Blake's illustrations in their totality would take issue with the text they accompany: in the margin of Homer Bearing the Sword and His Companions, Blake notes, "Every thing in Dantes Comedia shews That for Tyrannical Purposes he has made This World the Foundation of All & the Goddess Nature & not the Holy Ghost." Blake seems to dissent from Dante's admiration of the poetic works of ancient Greece, and from the apparent glee with which Dante allots punishments in Hell (as evidenced by the grim humour of the cantos).

At the same time, Blake shared Dante's distrust of materialism and the corruptive nature of power, and clearly relished the opportunity to represent the atmosphere and imagery of Dante's work pictorially. Even as he seemed to be near death, Blake's central preoccupation was his feverish work on the illustrations to Dante's Inferno; he is said to have spent one of the last shillings he possessed on a pencil to continue sketching.

== Final years ==
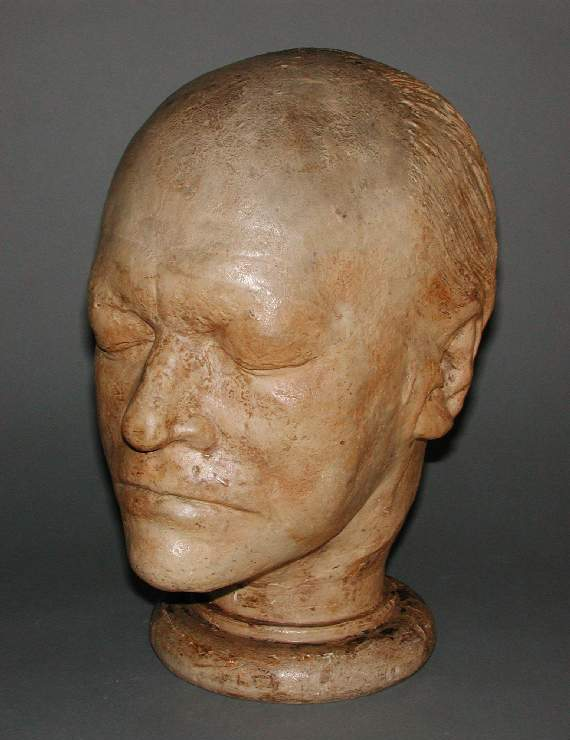
"Head of William Blake" by James De Ville. Life mask taken in plaster cast in September 1823, Fitzwilliam Museum.

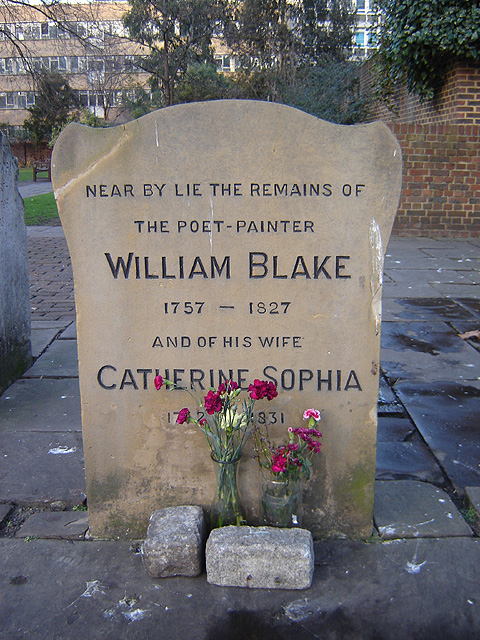
Headstone in Bunhill Fields, London, erected on Blake's grave in 1927 and moved to its present location in 1964–65

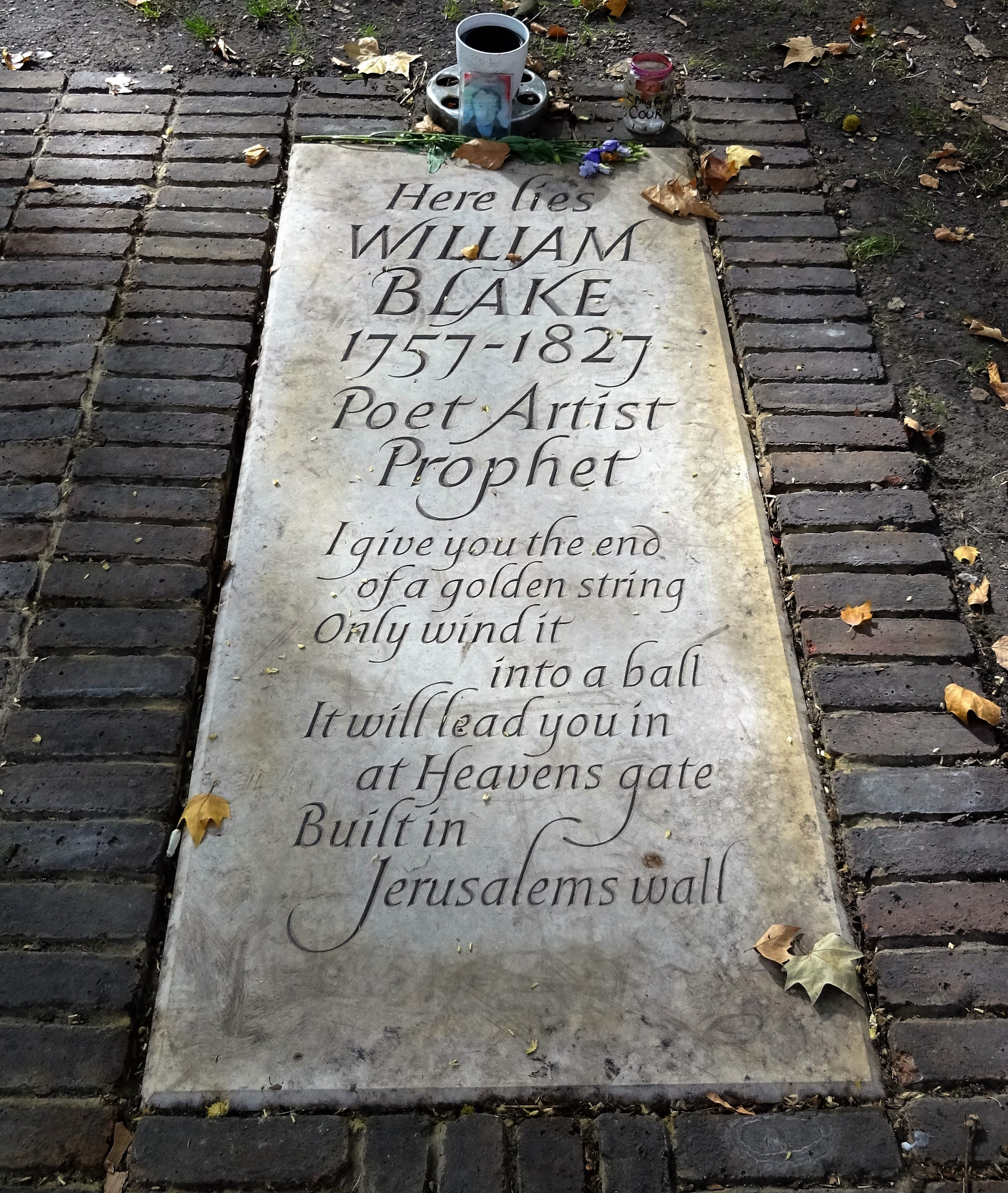
Ledger stone on Blake's grave, unveiled in 2018

Blake's last years were spent at Fountain Court off the Strand (the property was demolished in the 1880s, when the Savoy Hotel was built). On the day of his death (12 August 1827), Blake worked relentlessly on his Dante series. Eventually, it is reported, he ceased working and turned to his wife, who was in tears by his bedside. Beholding her, Blake is said to have cried, "Stay Kate! Keep just as you are – I will draw your portrait – for you have ever been an angel to me." Having completed this portrait (now lost), Blake laid down his tools and began to sing hymns and verses. At six that evening, after promising his wife that he would be with her always, Blake died. Gilchrist reports that a female lodger in the house, present at his expiration, said, "I have been at the death, not of a man, but of a blessed angel."

George Richmond gives the following account of Blake's death in a letter to Samuel Palmer:

He died ... in a most glorious manner. He said He was going to that Country he had all His life wished to see & expressed Himself Happy, hoping for Salvation through Jesus Christ – Just before he died His Countenance became fair. His eyes Brighten'd and he burst out Singing of the things he saw in Heaven.

Catherine paid for Blake's funeral with money lent to her by Linnell. Blake's body was buried in a plot shared with others, five days after his death – on the eve of his 45th wedding anniversary – at the Dissenters's burial ground in Bunhill Fields, in the City of London area. His parents' bodies were buried in the same graveyard. Present at the ceremonies were Catherine, Edward Calvert, George Richmond, Frederick Tatham and John Linnell. Following Blake's death, Catherine moved into Tatham's house as a housekeeper. She believed she was regularly visited by Blake's spirit. She continued selling his illuminated works and paintings, but entertained no business transaction without first "consulting Mr. Blake". On the day of her death, in October 1831, she was as calm and cheerful as her husband, and called out to him "as if he were only in the next room, to say she was coming to him, and it would not be long now."

On her death, longtime acquaintance Frederick Tatham took possession of Blake's works and continued selling them. Tatham later joined the fundamentalist Irvingite church and under the influence of conservative members of that church allegedly burned manuscripts that he deemed heretical. The exact number of destroyed manuscripts is unknown, but shortly before his death Blake told a friend he had written "twenty tragedies as long as Macbeth", none of which survive. Another acquaintance, William Michael Rossetti, also burned works by Blake that he considered lacking in quality, and John Linnell erased sexual imagery from a number of Blake's drawings. At the same time, some works not intended for publication were preserved by friends, such as his notebook and An Island in the Moon.

Blake's grave is commemorated by two stones. The first was a stone that reads "Near by lie the remains of the poet-painter William Blake 1757–1827 and his wife Catherine Sophia 1762–1831". The memorial stone is situated approximately 20 metres (66 ft) away from the actual grave, which was not marked until 12 August 2018. For years since 1965, the exact location of William Blake's grave had been lost and forgotten. The area had been damaged in the Second World War; gravestones were removed and a garden was created. The memorial stone, indicating that the burial sites are "nearby", was listed as a Grade II listed structure in 2011. A Portuguese couple, Carol and Luís Garrido, rediscovered the exact burial location after 14 years of investigatory work, and the Blake Society organised a permanent memorial slab, which was unveiled at a public ceremony at the site on 12 August 2018. The new stone is inscribed "Here lies William Blake 1757–1827 Poet Artist Prophet" above a verse from his poem Jerusalem.It engraved by letter-cutter Lida Cardozo Kindersley.

The Blake Prize for Religious Art was established in his honour in Australia in 1949. In 1957 a memorial to Blake and his wife was erected in Westminster Abbey. Another memorial lies in St James's Church, Piccadilly, where he was baptised.

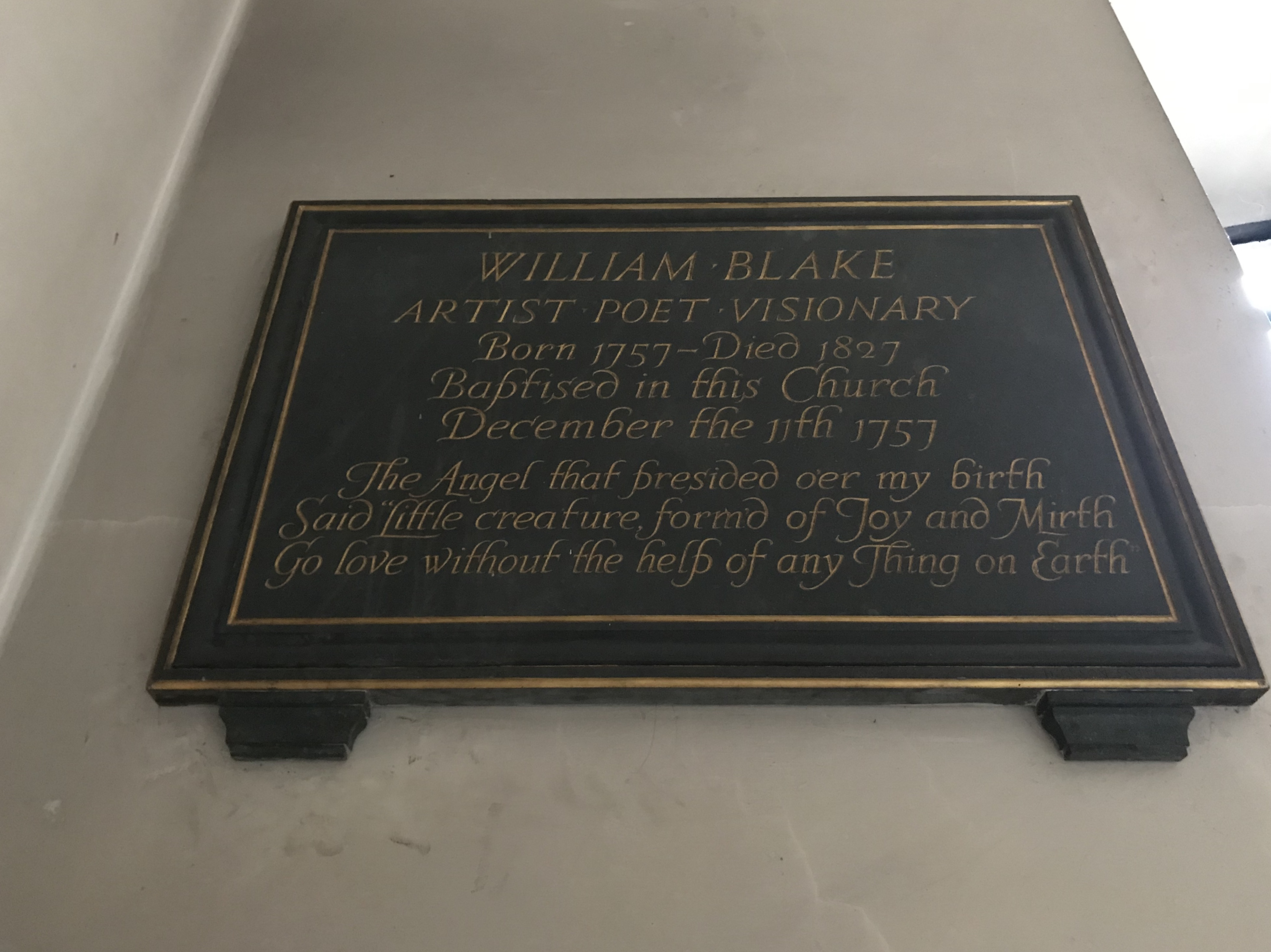
A memorial to William Blake in St James's Church, Piccadilly

At the time of Blake's death, he had sold fewer than 30 copies of Songs of Innocence and of Experience.

== Opinions ==
=== Politics ===
Blake was not active in any well-established political party. His poetry consistently embodies an attitude of rebellion against the abuse of class power as documented in David Erdman's study Blake: Prophet Against Empire: A Poet's Interpretation of the History of His Own Times (1954). Blake was concerned about senseless wars and the blighting effects of the Industrial Revolution on the mental capacites of the human. As Steven Goldsmith suggests, Blake viewed the emotions as anemic to politics, distracting one's mind from actual thinking into mere comfort. Much of his poetry recounts in symbolic allegory the effects of the French and American revolutions. Erdman claims Blake was disillusioned with the political outcomes of the conflicts, believing they had simply replaced monarchy with irresponsible mercantilism. Erdman also notes Blake was deeply opposed to slavery and believes some of his poems, read primarily as championing "free love", had their anti-slavery implications short-changed. A more recent study, William Blake: Visionary Anarchist by Peter Marshall (1988), classified Blake and his contemporary William Godwin as forerunners of modern anarchism. The British Marxist historian E. P. Thompson's last finished work, Witness Against the Beast: William Blake and the Moral Law (1993), claims to show how far he was inspired by dissident religious ideas rooted in the thinking of the most radical opponents of the monarchy during the English Civil War.

=== Development of views ===
Because Blake's later poetry contains a private mythology with complex symbolism, his late work has been less published than his earlier more accessible work. The Vintage anthology of Blake edited by Patti Smith focuses heavily on the earlier work, as do many critical studies such as William Blake by D. G. Gillham.

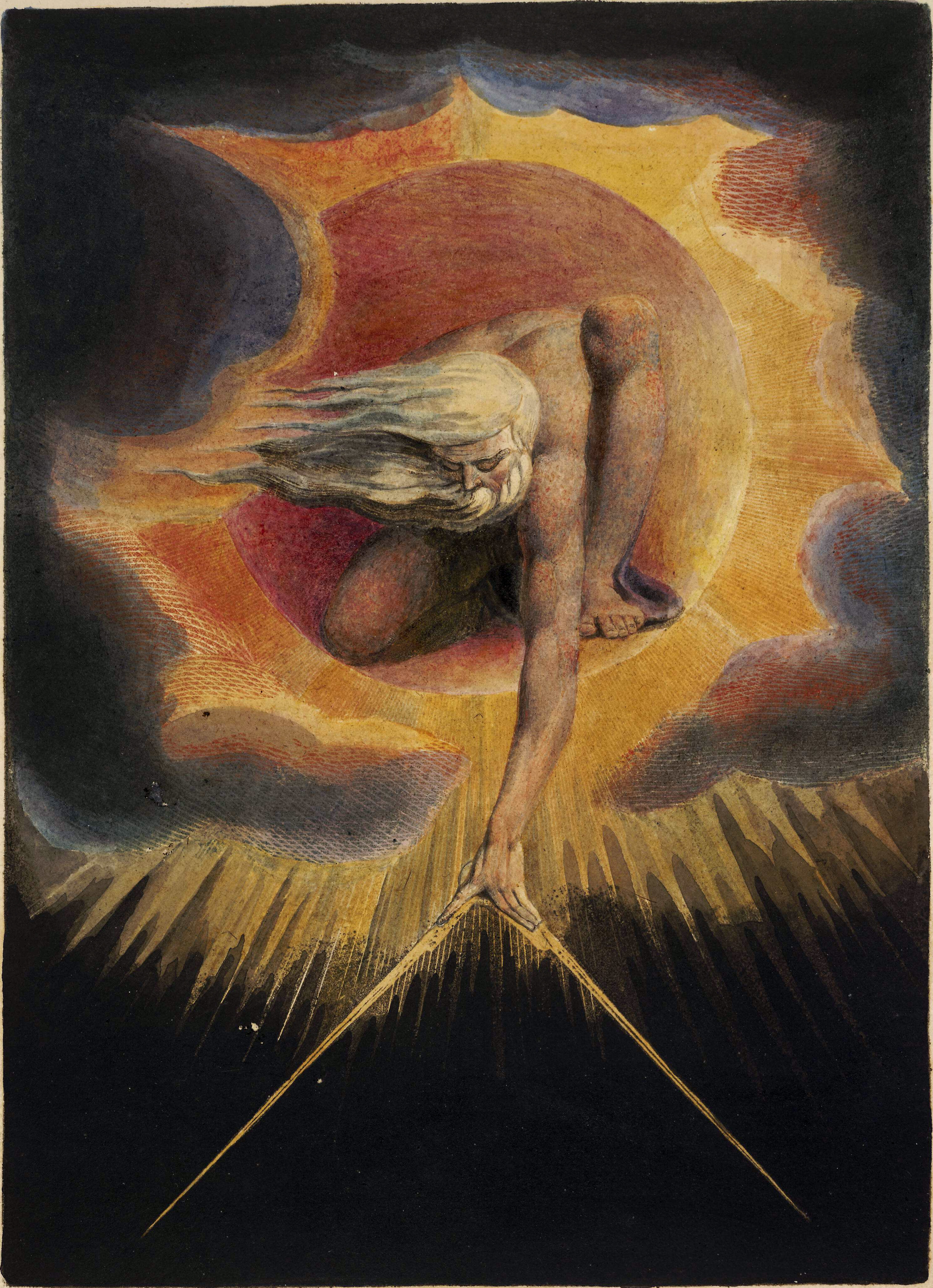
Urizen − from Blake's Ancient of Days, 1794. The "Ancient of Days" is described in Chapter 7 of the Book of Daniel. This image depicts Copy D of the illustration currently held at the British Museum.

The earlier work is primarily rebellious in character and can be seen as a protest against dogmatic religion especially notable in The Marriage of Heaven and Hell, in which the figure represented by the "Devil" is virtually a hero rebelling against an imposter authoritarian deity. In later works, such as Milton and Jerusalem, Blake carves a distinctive vision of a humanity redeemed by self-sacrifice and forgiveness, while retaining his earlier negative attitude towards what he felt was the rigid and morbid authoritarianism of traditional religion. Not all readers of Blake agree upon how much continuity exists between Blake's earlier and later works.

Psychoanalyst June Singer has written that Blake's late work displayed a development of the ideas first introduced in his earlier works, namely, the humanitarian goal of achieving personal wholeness of body and spirit. The final section of the expanded edition of her Blake study The Unholy Bible suggests the later works are the "Bible of Hell" promised in The Marriage of Heaven and Hell. Regarding Blake's final poem, Jerusalem, she writes: "The promise of the divine in man, made in The Marriage of Heaven and Hell, is at last fulfilled."

John Middleton Murry notes discontinuity between Marriage and the late works, in that while the early Blake focused on a "sheer negative opposition between Energy and Reason", the later Blake emphasised the notions of self-sacrifice and forgiveness as the road to interior wholeness. This renunciation of the sharper dualism of Marriage of Heaven and Hell is evidenced in particular by the humanisation of the character of Urizen in the later works. Murry characterises the later Blake as having found "mutual understanding" and "mutual forgiveness".

=== Religious views ===
Regarding conventional religion, Blake was a satirist and ironist in his viewpoints which are illustrated and summarised in his poem Vala, or The Four Zoas, one of his uncompleted prophetic books begun in 1797. The demi-mythological and demi-religious main characters of the book are the Four Zoas (Urthona, Urizen, Luvah and Tharmas), who were created by the fall of Albion in Blake's mythology. It consists of nine books, referred to as "nights". These outline the interactions of the Zoas, their fallen forms and their Emanations. Blake intended the book to be a summation of his mythic universe. Blake's Four Zoas represent four aspects of the Almighty God, and Vala is the first work to mention them. In particular, Blake's God/Man union is broken down into the bodily components of Urizen (head), Urthona (loins), Luvah (heart), and Tharmas (unity of the body) with paired Emanations being Ahania (wisdom, from the head), Enitharmon (what can't be attained in nature, from the loins), Vala (nature, from the heart), and Enion (earth mother, from the separation of unity). As connected to Blake's understanding of the divine, the Zoas are the God the Father (Tharmas, sense), the Son of God (Luvah, love), the Holy Ghost (Urthona, imagination), and Satan who was originally of the divine substance (Urizen, reason) and their Emanations represent Sexual Urges (Enion), Nature (Vala), Inspiration (Enitharmon), and Pleasure (Ahania).

Blake believed that each person had a twofold identity with one half being good and the other evil. In Vala, both the character Orc and The Eternal Man discuss their selves as divided. By the time he was working on his later works, including Vala, Blake felt that he was able to overcome his inner battle but he was concerned about losing his artistic abilities. These thoughts carried over into Vala as the character Los (imagination) is connected to the image of Christ, and he added a Christian element to his mythic world. In the revised version of Vala, Blake added Christian and Hebrew images and describes how Los experiences a vision of the Lamb of God that regenerates Los's spirit. In opposition to Christ is Urizen and the Synagogue of Satan, who later crucifies Christ. It is from them that Deism is born.

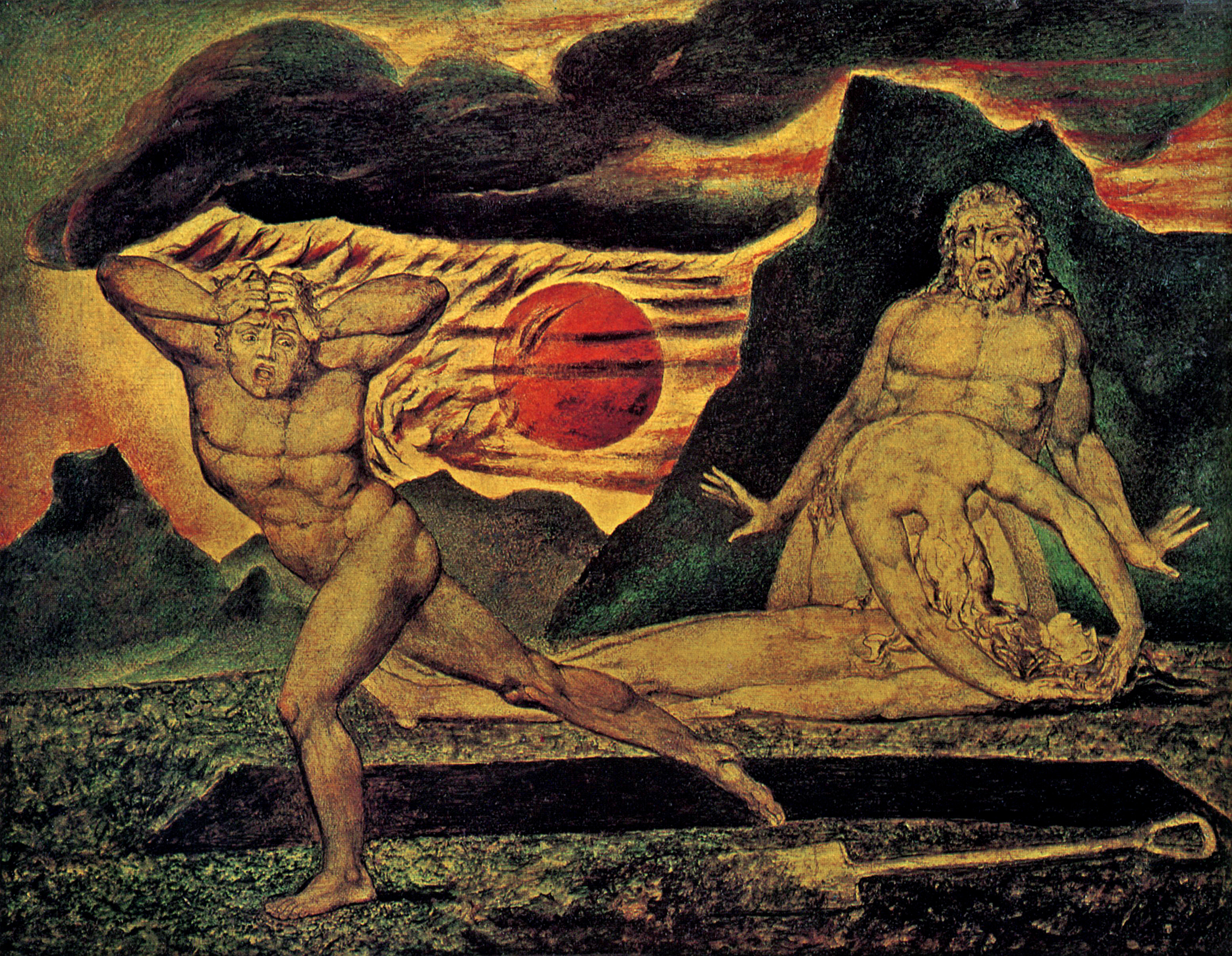
The Body of Abel Found by Adam and Eve, c. 1825. Watercolour on wood.

Blake did not subscribe to the notion of a body distinct from the soul that must submit to the rule of the soul, but sees the body as an extension of the soul, derived from the "discernment" of the senses. Thus, the emphasis orthodoxy places upon the denial of bodily urges is a dualistic error born of misapprehension of the relationship between body and soul. Elsewhere, he describes Satan as the "state of error", and as beyond salvation.

Blake opposed the sophistry of theological thought that excuses pain, admits evil and apologises for injustice. He abhorred self-denial, which he associated with religious repression and particularly sexual repression:

Prudence is a rich ugly old maid courted by Incapacity.
He who desires but acts not breeds pestilence. (7.4–5, E35)

He saw the concept of "sin" as a trap to bind men's desires (the briars of Garden of Love), and believed that restraint in obedience to a moral code imposed from the outside was against the spirit of life:

Abstinence sows sand all over
The ruddy limbs & flaming hair
But Desire Gratified
Plants fruits & beauty there. (E474)

He did not hold with the doctrine of God as Lord, an entity separate from and superior to mankind; this is shown clearly in his words about Jesus Christ: "He is the only God ... and so am I, and so are you." A telling phrase in The Marriage of Heaven and Hell is "men forgot that All deities reside in the human breast".

== Enlightenment philosophy ==
Blake had a complex relationship with Enlightenment philosophy. His championing of the imagination as the most important element of human existence ran contrary to Enlightenment ideals of rationalism and empiricism. Due to his visionary religious beliefs, he opposed the Newtonian view of the universe. This mindset is reflected in an excerpt from Blake's Jerusalem:

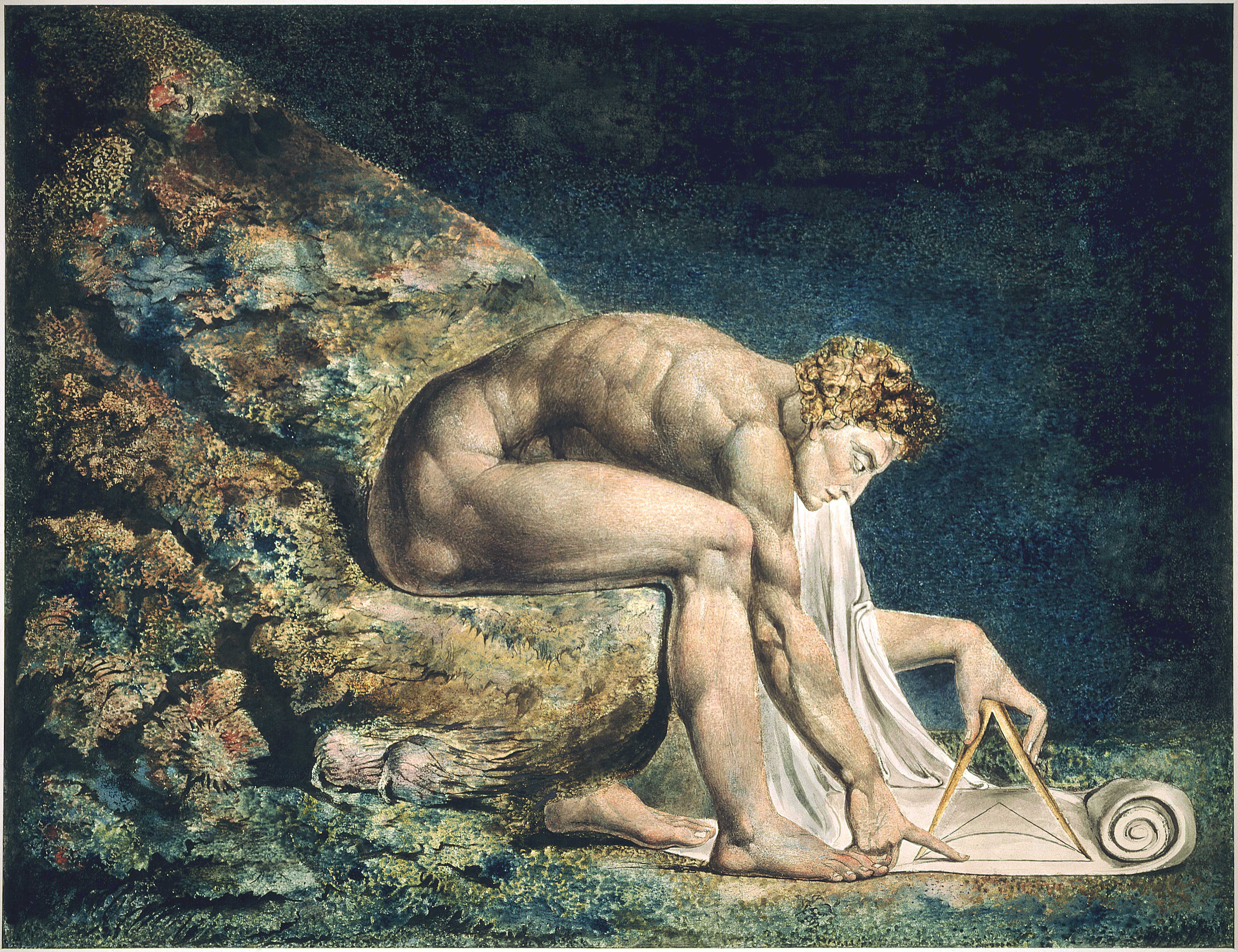
Blake's Newton (1795) demonstrates his opposition to the "single-vision" of scientific materialism: Newton fixes his eye on a pair of compasses (recalling Proverbs 8:27, an important passage for John Milton) to write upon a scroll that seems to project from his own head.

I turn my eyes to the Schools & Universities of Europe
And there behold the Loom of Locke whose Woof rages dire
Washd by the Water-wheels of Newton. Black the cloth
In heavy wreathes folds over every Nation; cruel Works
Of many Wheels I view, wheel without wheel, with cogs tyrannic
Moving by compulsion each other: not as those in Eden: which
Wheel within Wheel in freedom revolve in harmony & peace. (15.14–20, E159)

Blake believed the paintings of Sir Joshua Reynolds, which depict the naturalistic fall of light upon objects, were products entirely of the "vegetative eye", and he saw Locke and Newton as "the true progenitors of Sir Joshua Reynolds' aesthetic". The popular taste in the England of that time for such paintings was satisfied with mezzotints, prints produced by a process that created an image from thousands of tiny dots upon the page. Blake saw an analogy between this and Newton's particle theory of light. Accordingly, Blake never used the technique, opting rather to develop a method of engraving purely in fluid line, insisting that:

a Line or Lineament is not formed by Chance a Line is a Line in its Minutest Subdivision[s] Strait or Crooked It is Itself & Not Intermeasurable with or by any Thing Else Such is Job. (E784)

It has been supposed that, despite his opposition to Enlightenment principles, Blake arrived at a linear aesthetic that was in many ways more similar to the Neoclassical engravings of John Flaxman than to the works of the Romantics, with whom he is often classified. However, Blake's relationship with Flaxman seems to have grown more distant after Blake's return from Felpham, and there are surviving letters between Flaxman and Hayley wherein Flaxman speaks ill of Blake's theories of art. Blake further criticised Flaxman's styles and theories of art in his responses to criticism made against his print of Chaucer's Caunterbury Pilgrims in 1810.

== Sexuality ==
=== "Free Love" ===
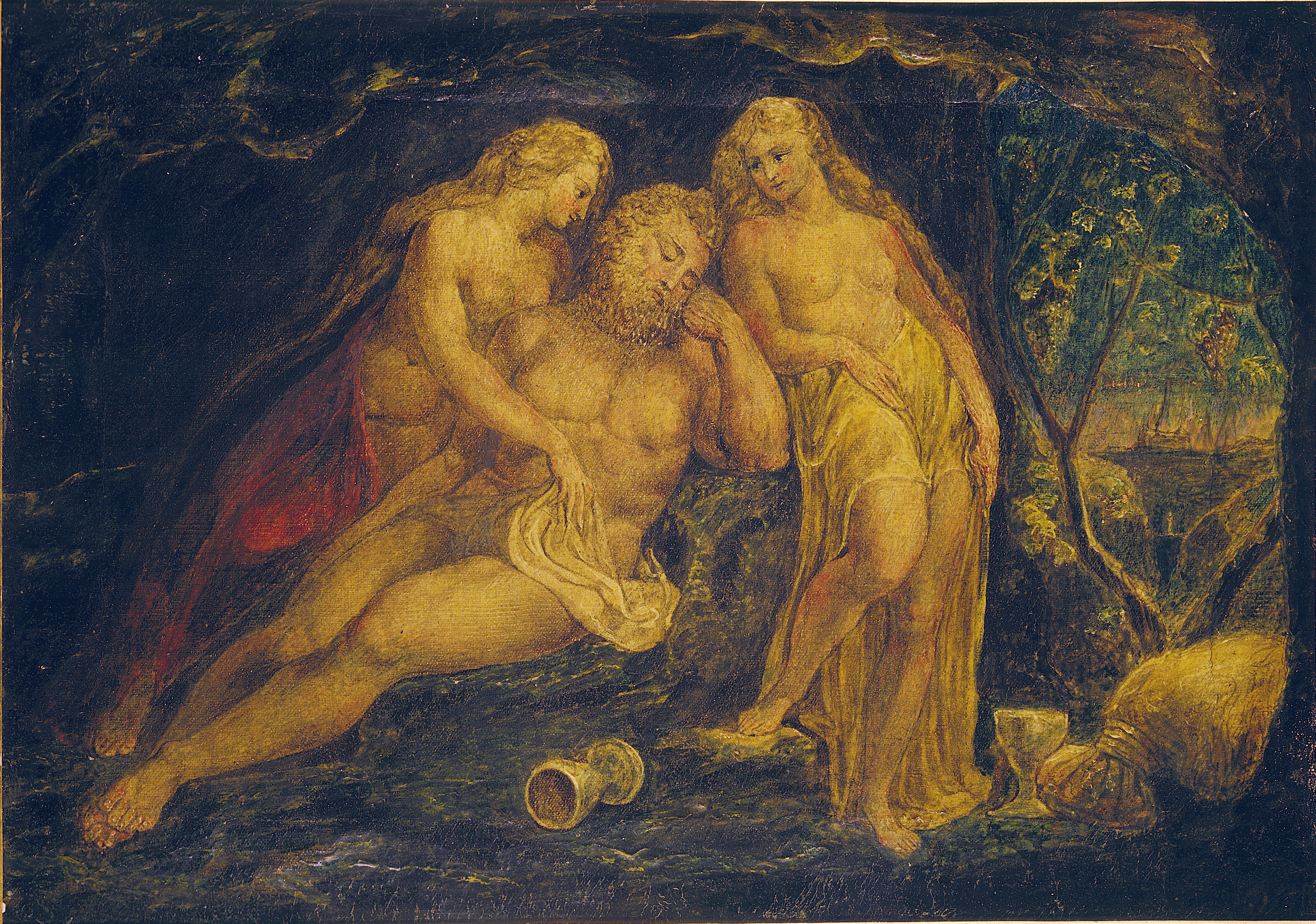
Blake's Lot and His Daughters, Huntington Library, c. 1800

Since his death, Blake has been claimed by those of various movements who apply his complex and often elusive use of symbolism and allegory to the issues that concern them. In particular, Blake is sometimes considered (along with Mary Wollstonecraft and her husband William Godwin) a forerunner of the 19th-century "free love" movement, a broad reform tradition starting in the 1820s that held that marriage is slavery, and advocated the removal of all state restrictions on sexual activity such as homosexuality, prostitution and adultery, culminating in the birth control movement of the early 20th century. Blake scholarship was more focused on this theme in the earlier 20th century, although it is still mentioned by the Blake scholar Magnus Ankarsjö who moderately challenges this interpretation. The 19th-century "free love" movement was not particularly focused on the idea of multiple partners, but did agree with Wollstonecraft that state-sanctioned marriage was "legal prostitution" and monopolistic in character. It has somewhat more in common with early feminist movements (particularly with regard to the writings of Mary Wollstonecraft, whom Blake admired).

Blake was critical of the marriage laws of his day, and generally railed against traditional Christian notions of chastity as a virtue. At a time of tremendous strain in his marriage, in part due to Catherine's apparent inability to bear children, he directly advocated bringing a second wife into the house. His poetry suggests that external demands for marital fidelity reduce love to mere duty rather than authentic affection, and decries jealousy and egotism as a motive for marriage laws. Poems such as "Why should I be bound to thee, O my lovely Myrtle-tree?" and "Earth's Answer" seem to advocate multiple sexual partners. In his poem "London" he speaks of "the Marriage-Hearse" plagued by "the youthful Harlot's curse", the result alternatively of false Prudence and/or Harlotry. Visions of the Daughters of Albion is widely (though not universally) read as a tribute to free love since the relationship between Bromion and Oothoon is held together only by laws and not by love. For Blake, law and love are opposed, and he castigates the "frozen marriage-bed". In Visions, Blake writes:

Till she who burns with youth, and knows no fixed lot, is bound
In spells of law to one she loathes? and must she drag the chain
Of life in weary lust? (5.21-3, E49)

In the 19th century the poet and free-love advocate Algernon Charles Swinburne wrote a book on Blake drawing attention to the above motifs in which Blake praises "sacred natural love" that is not bound by another's possessive jealousy, the latter characterised by Blake as a "creeping skeleton". Swinburne notes how Blake's Marriage of Heaven and Hell condemns the hypocrisy of the "pale religious letchery" of advocates of traditional norms. Another 19th-century free love advocate, Edward Carpenter (1844–1929), was influenced by Blake's mystical emphasis on energy free from external restrictions.

In the early 20th century, Pierre Berger described how Blake's views echo Wollstonecraft's celebration of joyful authentic love rather than love born of duty, the former being the true measure of purity. Irene Langridge notes that "in Blake's mysterious and unorthodox creed the doctrine of free love was something Blake wanted for the edification of 'the soul'." Michael Davis' 1977 book William Blake a New Kind of Man suggests that Blake thought jealousy separates man from the divine unity, condemning him to a frozen death.

As a theological writer, Blake has a sense of human "fallenness". S. Foster Damon noted that for Blake the major impediments to a free love society were corrupt human nature, not merely the intolerance of society and the jealousy of men, but the inauthentic hypocritical nature of human communication. Thomas Wright's 1928 book Life of William Blake (entirely devoted to Blake's doctrine of free love) notes that Blake thinks marriage should in practice afford the joy of love, but notes that in reality it often does not, as a couple's knowledge of being chained often diminishes their joy. Pierre Berger also analyses Blake's early mythological poems such as Ahania as declaring marriage laws to be a consequence of the fallenness of humanity, as these are born from pride and jealousy.

Some scholars have noted that Blake's views on "free love" are both qualified and may have undergone shifts and modifications in his late years. Some poems from this period warn of dangers of predatory sexuality such as The Sick Rose. Magnus Ankarsjö notes that while the hero of Visions of the Daughters of Albion is a strong advocate of free love, by the end of the poem she has become more circumspect as her awareness of the dark side of sexuality has grown, crying "Can this be love which drinks another as a sponge drinks water?" Ankarsjö also notes that a major inspiration to Blake, Mary Wollstonecraft, similarly developed more circumspect views of sexual freedom late in life. In light of Blake's aforementioned sense of human 'fallenness' Ankarsjö thinks Blake does not fully approve of sensual indulgence merely in defiance of law as exemplified by the female character of Leutha, since in the fallen world of experience all love is enchained. Ankarsjö records Blake as having supported a commune with some sharing of partners, though David Worrall read The Book of Thel as a rejection of the proposal to take concubines espoused by some members of the Swedenborgian church.

Blake's later writings show a renewed interest in Christianity, and although he radically reinterprets Christian morality in a way that embraces sensual pleasure, there is little of the emphasis on sexual libertarianism found in several of his early poems, and there is advocacy of "self-denial", though such abnegation must be inspired by love rather than through authoritarian compulsion. Berger (more so than Swinburne) is especially sensitive to a shift in sensibility between the early Blake and the later Blake. Berger believes the young Blake placed too much emphasis on following impulses, and that the older Blake had a better formed ideal of a true love that sacrifices self. Some celebration of mystical sensuality remains in the late poems (most notably in Blake's denial of the virginity of Jesus's mother). However, the late poems also place a greater emphasis on forgiveness, redemption, and emotional authenticity as a foundation for relationships.

== Legacy ==
=== Creativity ===
Northrop Frye, commenting on Blake's consistency in strongly held views, notes that Blake

himself says that his notes on [Joshua] Reynolds, written at fifty, are 'exactly Similar' to those on Locke and Bacon, written when he was 'very Young'. Even phrases and lines of verse will reappear as much as forty years later. Consistency in maintaining what he believed to be true was itself one of his leading principles ... Consistency, then, foolish or otherwise, is one of Blake's chief preoccupations, just as 'self-contradiction' is always one of his most contemptuous comments.

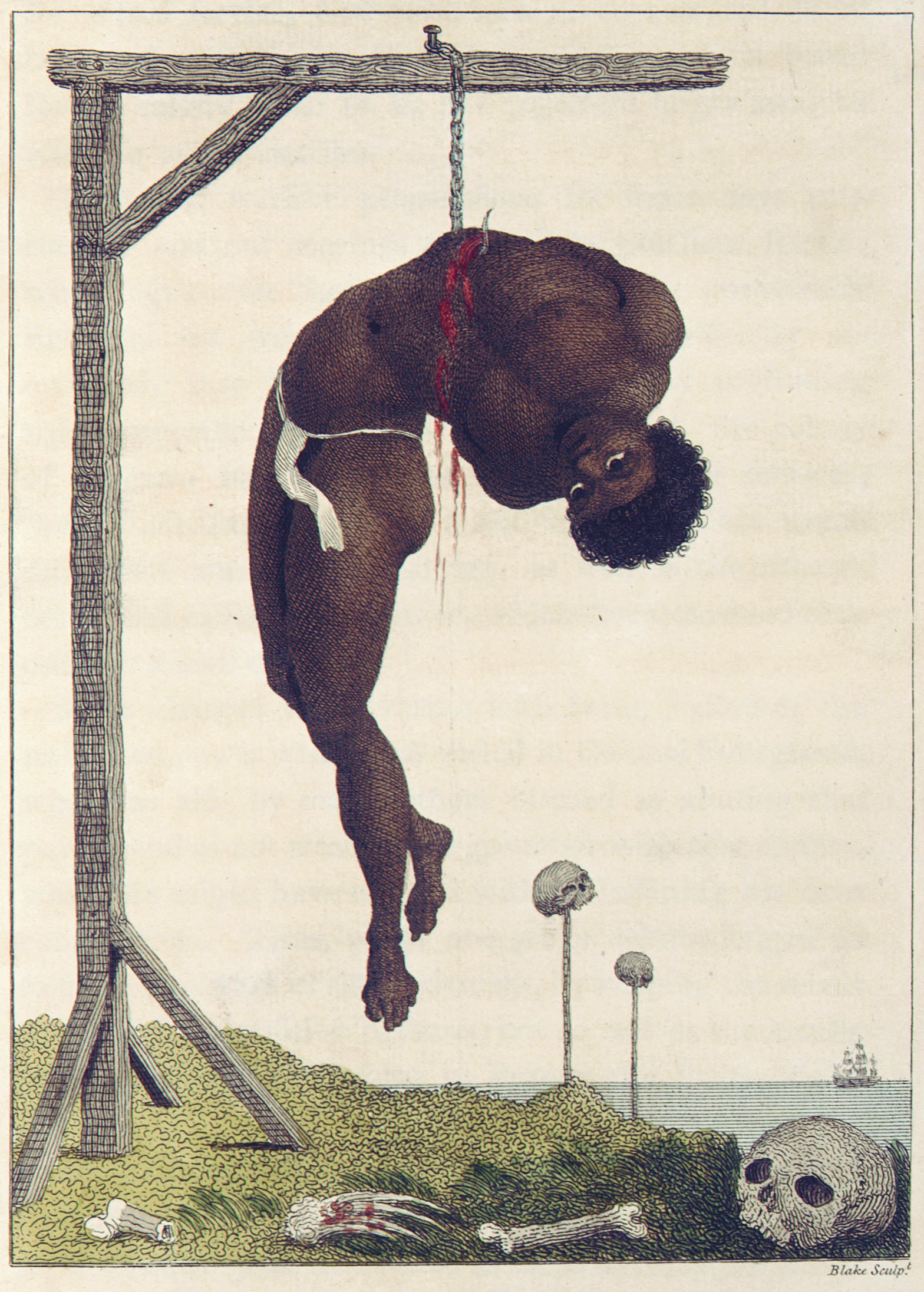
Blake's A Negro Hung Alive by the Ribs to a Gallows, an illustration to John Gabriel Stedman's Narrative, of a Five Years' Expedition, against the Revolted Negroes of Surinam (1796)

Blake was critical of slavery, and believed in racial equality while his views on gender equality are subject to some scholarly debate. Several of his poems and paintings express a notion of universal humanity: "As all men are alike (tho' infinitely various)". In one poem, in which Blake co-opts the perspective of a black child, white and black bodies alike are described as shaded groves or clouds, which exist only until one learns "to bear the beams of love":

When I from black and he from white cloud free,
And round the tent of God like lambs we joy:
I'll shade him from the heat till he can bear,
To lean in joy upon our fathers knee.
And then I'll stand and stroke his silver hair,
And be like him and he will then love me. (23-8, E9)

Blake retained an active interest in social and political events throughout his life, and social and political statements are often present in his mystical symbolism. His views on what he saw as oppression and restriction of rightful freedom extended to the Church. His spiritual beliefs are evident in Songs of Experience (1794), in which he distinguishes between the Old Testament God, whose restrictions he rejected, and the New Testament God whom he saw as a positive influence.

=== Visions ===
From a young age, Blake claimed to have seen visions. The first may have occurred as early as the age of four when, according to one anecdote, the young artist "saw God" when God "put his head to the window", causing Blake to break into screaming. At the age of eight or ten in Peckham Rye, London, Blake claimed to have seen "a tree filled with angels, bright angelic wings bespangling every bough like stars." According to Blake's Victorian biographer Gilchrist, he returned home and reported the vision and only escaped being thrashed by his father for telling a lie through the intervention of his mother. Though all evidence suggests that his parents were largely supportive, his mother seems to have been especially so, and several of Blake's early drawings and poems decorated the walls of her chamber. On another occasion, Blake watched haymakers at work, and thought he saw angelic figures walking among them.

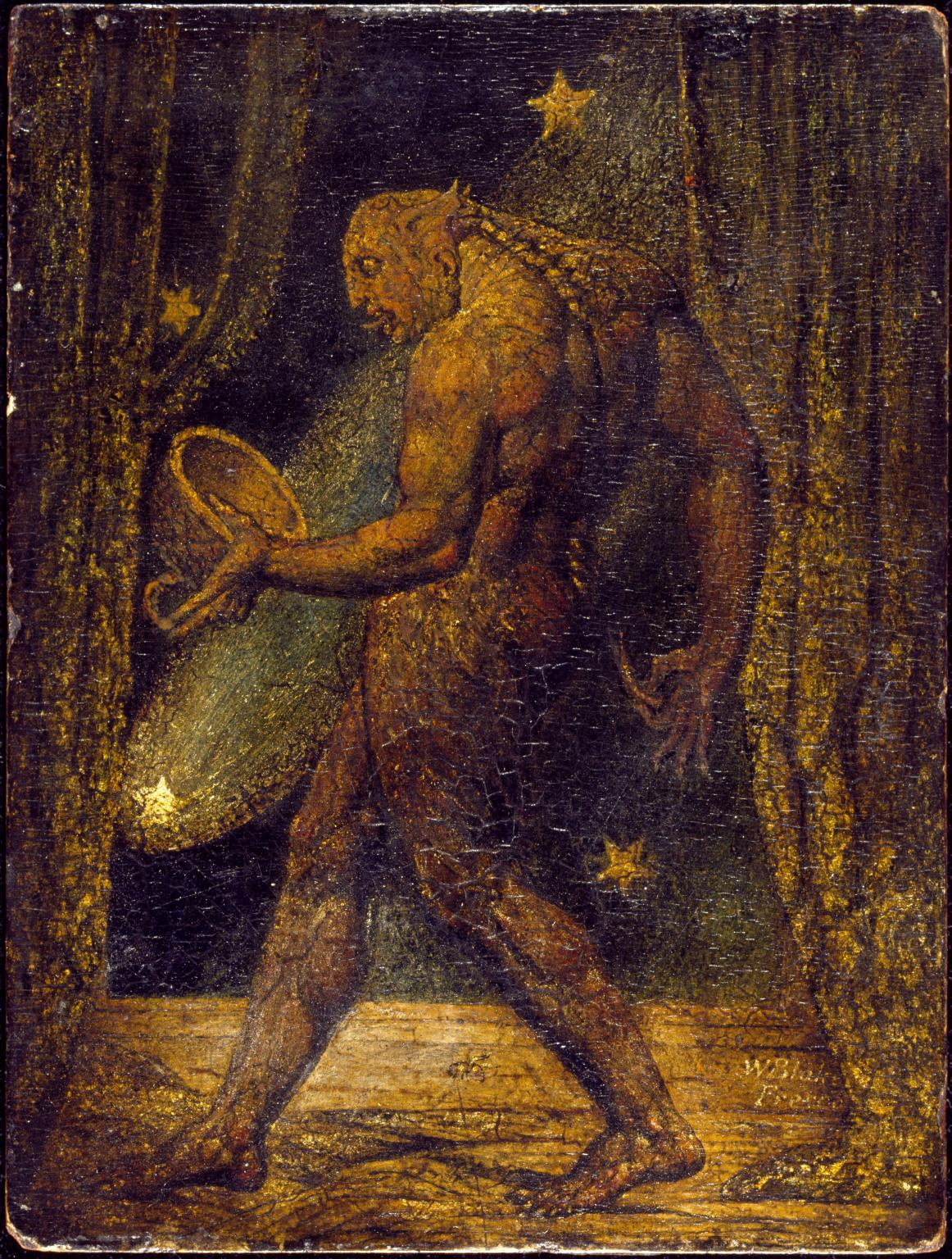
The Ghost of a Flea, 1819–1820. Having informed the painter-astrologer John Varley of his visions of apparitions, Blake was subsequently persuaded to paint one of them. Varley's anecdote of Blake and his vision of the flea's ghost became well-known.

Blake claimed to experience visions throughout his life. They were often associated with beautiful religious themes and imagery, and may have inspired him further with spiritual works and pursuits. Certainly, religious concepts and imagery figure centrally in Blake's works. God and Christianity constituted the intellectual centre of his writings, from which he drew inspiration. Blake believed he was personally instructed and encouraged by Archangels to create his artistic works, which he claimed were actively read and enjoyed by the same Archangels. In a letter of condolence to William Hayley, dated 6 May 1800, four days after the death of Hayley's son, Blake wrote:

I know that our deceased friends are more really with us than when they were apparent to our mortal part. Thirteen years ago I lost a brother, and with his spirit I converse daily and hourly in the spirit, and see him in my remembrance, in the region of my imagination. I hear his advice, and even now write from his dictate.

In a letter to John Flaxman, dated 21 September 1800, Blake wrote:

[The town of] Felpham is a sweet place for Study, because it is more spiritual than London. Heaven opens here on all sides her golden Gates; her windows are not obstructed by vapours; voices of Celestial inhabitants are more distinctly heard, & their forms more distinctly seen; & my Cottage is also a Shadow of their houses. My Wife & Sister are both well, courting Neptune for an embrace... I am more famed in Heaven for my works than I could well conceive. In my Brain are studies & Chambers filled with books & pictures of old, which I wrote & painted in ages of Eternity before my mortal life; & those works are the delight & Study of Archangels. (E710)

In a letter to Thomas Butts, dated 25 April 1803, Blake wrote:

Now I may say to you, what perhaps I should not dare to say to anyone else: That I can alone carry on my visionary studies in London unannoy'd, & that I may converse with my friends in Eternity, See Visions, Dream Dreams & prophecy & speak Parables unobserv'd & at liberty from the Doubts of other Mortals; perhaps Doubts proceeding from Kindness, but Doubts are always pernicious, Especially when we Doubt our Friends.

In A Vision of the Last Judgement Blake wrote:

Error is Created Truth is Eternal Error or Creation will be Burned Up & then & not till then Truth or Eternity will appear It is Burnt up the Moment Men cease to behold it I assert for My self that I do not behold the Outward Creation & that to me it is hindrance & not Action it is as the Dirt upon my feet No part of Me. What it will be Questiond When the Sun rises do you not see a round Disk of fire somewhat like a Guinea O no no I see an Innumerable company of the Heavenly host crying Holy Holy Holy is the Lord God Almighty I question not my Corporeal or Vegetative Eye any more than I would Question a Window concerning a Sight I look thro it & not with it. (E565-6)

Despite seeing angels and God, Blake also claimed to have seen Satan on the staircase of his South Molton Street home in London.

Aware of Blake's visions, William Wordsworth commented, "There was no doubt that this poor man was mad, but there is something in the madness of this man which interests me more than the sanity of Lord Byron and Walter Scott." In a more deferential vein, John William Cousins wrote in A Short Biographical Dictionary of English Literature that Blake was "a truly pious and loving soul, neglected and misunderstood by the world, but appreciated by an elect few", who "led a cheerful and contented life of poverty illumined by visions and celestial inspirations". Blake's sanity was called into question as recently as the publication of the 1911 Encyclopædia Britannica, whose entry on Blake comments that "the question whether Blake was or was not mad seems likely to remain in dispute, but there can be no doubt whatever that he was at different periods of his life under the influence of illusions for which there are no outward facts to account, and that much of what he wrote is so far wanting in the quality of sanity as to be without a logical coherence".

=== Cultural influence ===
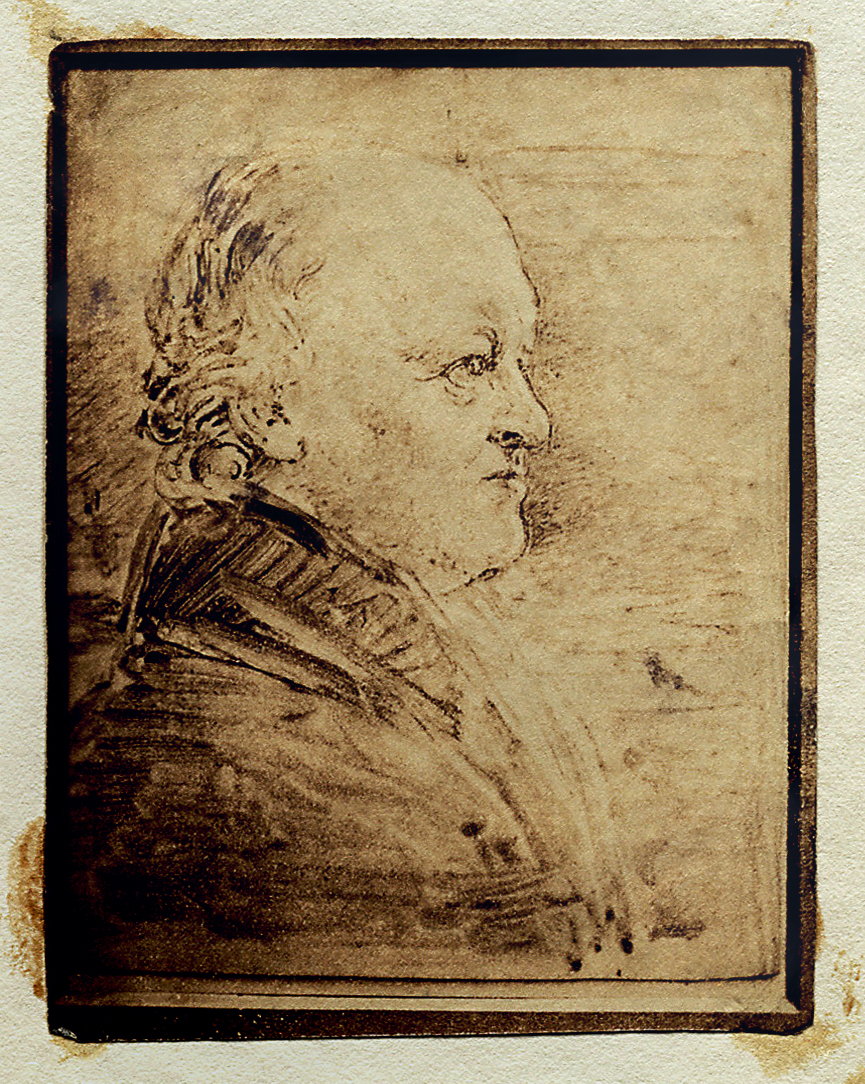
William Blake's portrait in profile, by John Linnell. This larger version was painted to be engraved as the frontispiece of Alexander Gilchrist's Life of Blake (1863).

Blake's work was neglected for a generation after his death and almost forgotten by the time Alexander Gilchrist began work on his biography in the 1860s. The publication of the Life of William Blake rapidly transformed Blake's reputation, in particular as he was taken up by Pre-Raphaelites and associated figures, in particular Dante Gabriel Rossetti and Algernon Charles Swinburne. In the 20th century, however, Blake's work was fully appreciated and his influence increased. Important early and mid-20th-century scholars involved in enhancing Blake's standing in literary and artistic circles included S. Foster Damon, Geoffrey Keynes, Northrop Frye and David V. Erdman.

While Blake had a significant role in the art and poetry of figures such as Rossetti, it was during the Modernist period that this work began to influence a wider set of writers and artists. William Butler Yeats, who edited an edition of Blake's collected works in 1893, drew on him for poetic and philosophical ideas, while British surrealist art in particular drew on Blake's conceptions of non-mimetic, visionary practice in the painting of artists such as Paul Nash and Graham Sutherland.

His poetry came into use by a number of British classical composers, who set his works. The earliest such work known is Doyne Bell's setting of the poem Can I see another's woe, from Songs of Innocence and of Experience, published in 1876. Notable settings are by Benjamin Britten and Ralph Vaughan Williams, and John Tavener set several of Blake's poems, including The Lamb (as the 1982 work "The Lamb") and The Tyger.

Many such as June Singer have argued that Blake's thoughts on human nature anticipate and parallel the thinking of the psychoanalyst Carl Jung. In Jung's own words: "Blake [is] a tantalizing study, since he compiled a lot of half or undigested knowledge in his fantasies. According to my ideas they are an artistic production rather than an authentic representation of unconscious processes." Similarly, Diana Hume George claimed that Blake can be seen as a precursor to the ideas of Sigmund Freud.

Blake had an enormous influence on the beat poets of the 1950s and the counterculture of the 1960s, frequently being cited by such seminal figures as the beat poet Allen Ginsberg, the songwriters Bob Dylan, Richard Ashcroft, Jim Morrison, Van Morrison and Bruce Dickinson, and the writer Aldous Huxley. The Pulitzer Prize for Music–winning composer William Bolcom set Songs of Innocence and of Experience to music, with different poems set to different styles of music, "from modern techniques to Broadway to Country/Western" and reggae.

Much of the central conceit of Philip Pullman's fantasy trilogy His Dark Materials is rooted in the world of Blake's The Marriage of Heaven and Hell. Blake also features as a relatively significant character in Brian Catling's fantasy novel The Erstwhile, where his visions of angelic beings are figured into the story. The composer Kathleen Yearwood is one of many contemporary musicians that have set Blake's poems to music. After the Second World War, Blake's role in popular culture came to the fore in a variety of areas such as popular music, film and the graphic novel, leading Edward Larrissy to assert that "Blake is the Romantic writer who has exerted the most powerful influence on the twentieth century."

== Exhibitions ==
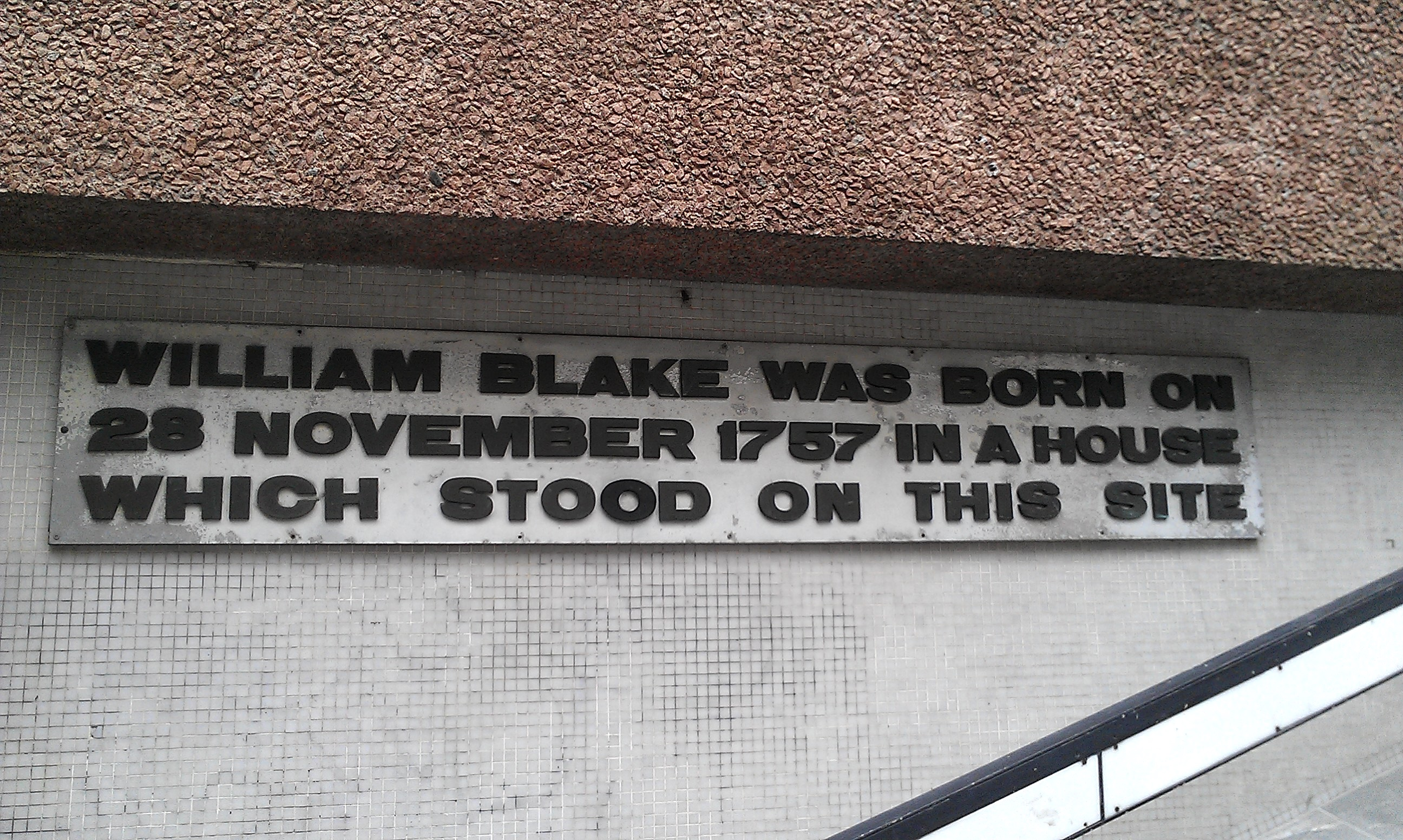
Memorial marking Blake's birthplace in Soho, City of Westminster

Major recent exhibitions focusing on William Blake include:

- An exhibition at Tate Britain in 2000–2001, William Blake, displayed the full range of William Blake's art and poetry, together with contextual materials, arranged in four sections: One of the Gothic Artists; The Furnace of Lambeth's Vale; Chambers of the Imagination; Many Formidable Works. The exhibit traveled to the Metropolitan Museum of Art in 2001.
- An exhibition at Tate Britain in 2007–2008, William Blake, coincided with the two hundred and fiftieth anniversary of William Blake's birth and included Blake works from the Gallery's permanent collection, but also private loans of recently discovered works which had never before been exhibited.
- The Scottish National Gallery 2007 exhibition William Blake coincided with the two hundred and fiftieth anniversary of William Blake's birth and featured all of the Gallery's works associated with Blake.
- The Morgan Library & Museum exhibition William Blake's World: A New Heaven Is Begun, open from September 2009 until January 2010, included more than 100 watercolours, prints, and illuminated books of poetry.
- The National Gallery of Victoria's exhibition William Blake in summer 2014 showcased the Gallery's collection of works by William Blake which includes spectacular watercolours, single prints and illustrated books.
- Oxford's Ashmolean Museum put on an exhibition William Blake: Apprentice and Master, open from December 2014 until March 2015, examining William Blake's formation as an artist, as well as his influence on young artist-printmakers who gathered around him in the last years of his life.
- In 2016, Blake bibliographer John Windle the world's first William Blake antique bookstore and art gallery opened in San Francisco, US.
- A major exhibition on Blake at Tate Britain in London opened in the autumn of 2019.
- An exhibition at the Fitzwilliam Museum, Cambridge, titled William Blake's Universe, ran between 23 February and 19 May 2024.
- At Museum of Fine Arts, Budapest The Marriage of Heaven and Hell – William Blake and his Contemporaries exhibited Blake’s works on loan from the Tate Collection alongside works that inspired Blake and works that were inspired by Blake. The exhibition ran from 26 September 2025 to 11 January 2026.
- The National Gallery of Ireland was expected to display William Blake: The Age of Romantic Fantasy from 16 April – 19 July 2026, presenting a selection of Blake’s most iconic works of art with paintings and drawings by his contemporaries.

== Bibliography ==
=== Illuminated books ===
- Songs of Innocence and of Experience (edited 1794)
  - Songs of Innocence (edited 1789)
- The Book of Thel* (written 1788–1790, edited 1789–1793)
- The Marriage of Heaven and Hell (written 1790–1793)
- The Gates of Paradise (written 1793, edited 1818)
- Visions of the Daughters of Albion* (edited 1793)
- Continental prophecies*
  - America a Prophecy (edited 1793)
  - Europe a Prophecy (edited 1794–1821)
  - The Song of Los (edited 1795)
- There is No Natural Religion (written 1788, possible edited 1794–1795)
- The First Book of Urizen* (edited 1794–1818)
- All Religions are One (written 1788, possible edited 1795)
- The Book of Los* (edited 1795)
- The Book of Ahania* (edited 1795)
- Milton* (written 1804–1810)
- Jerusalem: The Emanation of the Giant Albion* (written 1804–1820 additions even later, edited 1820–1827 and 1832)

=== Non-illuminated ===
- Poetical Sketches (written 1769–1777, edited 1783 and 1868 as a volume)
- An Island in the Moon (written 1784, unfinished)
- The French Revolution (edited 1791)
- A Song of Liberty (edited 1792, published in The Marriage of Heaven and Hell)
- Vala, or The Four Zoas* (written 1797–1807, unfinished)
- Tiriel* (written c. 1789, edited 1874)

The works with * constitute the prophetic books.

=== Illustrated by Blake ===
- Mary Wollstonecraft, Original Stories from Real Life (1791)
- John Gay, Fables by John Gay with a Life of the Author, John Stockdale, Picadilly (1793)
- Gottfried August Bürger, Leonora (not engraved by him) (1796)
- Edward Young, Night-Thoughts (1797)
- Thomas Gray, Poems (1798)
- Robert Blair, The Grave (1805–1808)
- John Milton, Paradise Lost (1808)
- John Varley, Visionary Heads (1819–1820)
- Robert John Thornton, The Pastorals of Virgil (1821)
- The Book of Job (1823–1826)
- John Bunyan, The Pilgrim's Progress (1824–1827, unfinished)
- Dante, Divine Comedy (1825–1827). Blake died in 1827 with work on these illustrations still unfinished. Of the 102 watercolours, 7 had been selected for engraving.
