= David V. Erdman =

American editor (1911–2001)

David V. Erdman (November 4, 1911, in Omaha, NE – October 14, 2001) was an American literary critic, editor, and Professor Emeritus of English at the State University of New York at Stony Brook. Professor Erdman established his reputation as a William Blake scholar.

== Early life and education ==
Erdman was born on November 4, 1911, in Omaha, Nebraska, to Carl Morris and Myrtle (Vorse) Erdman. He received his Bachelor of Arts from Carleton College in 1933. He then proceeded to Princeton University where he received a Ph.D. in 1936. After graduating from Princeton he married Virginia Bohan in 1937.

== Academic career ==
Throughout his career in academia Erdman held a number of university positions. After graduating from Princeton in 1936, he became a professor of English at the Agriculture, Mechanical and Normal College (now the University of Arkansas at Monticello). He held this position until the next year when he became an instructor of English at the University of Wisconsin—Madison. He stayed at Madison from 1937 until 1941. For the next year, he was an instructor in English at Olivet College, Olivet, MI. During the 1942-43 academic year, he was an assistant professor at The Citadel in Charleston, SC. For the next three years, he did not hold position at a university, but rather worked for the United Auto Workers-Congress of Industrial Organizations (UAW-CIO) in Detroit, MI as an editor in the education department, from 1943 until 1946. In 1948, he returned to the academy as an assistant professor at the University of Minnesota, Minneapolis, a position he held until 1954. In 1968, Erdman became a professor at the State University of New York at Stony Brook and began editing publications for the New York Public Library, New York, NY.

During his career he was also member of multiple scholarly societies, including Modern Language Association of America, Keats-Shelley Association, Shaw Society, and the English Institute (of which he was chair in 1960).

== Scholarship ==
Erdman's Blake: Prophet Against Empire was published in 1954. Jacob Bronowski stated that: "Blake: Prophet Against Empire is the most important book that has been written about Blake ... it expounded the view of Blake as a poet of social vision and human protest".

Erdman's edition of Blake's writings (with critical commentary by Harold Bloom) replaced the earlier edition by Sir Geoffrey Keynes as the standard reference within scholarship and has dominated since. Beyond his contributions to the poetic scholarship, with the publication of his ground-breaking "The Illuminated Blake," Erdman became the first Blake scholar to interpret Blake's illuminations and their interaction with Blake's poetry.

== Legacy ==
Erdman, as a high-profile Blake scholar, may have influenced a number of other scholars. For example, E.P. Thompson's Witness Against the Beast: William Blake and the Moral Law (1993) cites the pivotal importance of Erdman's scholarship. Linda Freeman attributes radical theologian Thomas J.J. Altizer's readings of Blake to time working with Erdman at Stony Brook.

His papers are held by the special collections at the University of Illinois. Additionally, materials from a memorial service are available at the collection at Stony Brook University.

== Bibliography ==
Erdman was a prolific scholar producing over sixty articles in professional journals. Additionally, Erdman wrote or edited the following monographs:

As author

- Blake: Prophet against Empire, Princeton University Press, 1954, 3rd edition, 1977.
- The Poems of William Blake, edited by W. H. Stevenson, Longman (Harlow, England), 1971.
- (Author of annotations) The Illuminated Blake: All of William Blake's Illuminated Works with a Plate-by-Plate Commentary, Anchor Press/Doubleday (Garden City, NY), 1974.
- (Author of commentary with Cettina Tramontane Magno) The Four Zoas Manuscript by William Blake: A Photographic Facsimile with Commentary on the Illuminations, Bucknell University Press, 1986.
- Commerce des lumieres: John Oswald and the British in Paris in 1790-1793, University of Missouri Press, 1986.

As editor

- Literature and the Other Arts: A Select Bibliography, 1952-1958, New York Public Library, 1959.
- The Poetry and Prose of William Blake, Doubleday, 1965, revised edition published as The Complete Poetry and Prose of William Blake, 1980, newly revised edition, commentary by Harold Bloom, University of California Press (Berkeley, CA), 1982.
- (with Ephim Fogel and contributor) Evidence for Authorship: Essays in Attribution, Cornell University Press, 1966.
- (with John E. Thiesmayer and others) A Concordance to the Writings of William Blake, (2 volumes), Cornell University Press, 1967.
- (with John E. Grant and contributor) Blake's Visionary Forms Dramatic, Princeton University Press, 1970.
- (with Donald K. Moore) The Notebook of William Blake: A Photographic and Typographic Facsimile, Oxford University Press, 1973, revised edition, Readex Books, 1977.
- William Blake, Selected Poetry, New American Library (New York, NY), 1976.
- S. T. Coleridge, Essays on His Times, three volumes, Princeton University Press, 1978.
- (Coordinating editor) William Blake's Designs for Edward Young's Night Thoughts, Oxford University Press, 1980.
- Blake and His Bibles, introduction by Mark Trevor Smith, Locust Hill Press (West Cornwall, CT), 1990.
- (with David Worrall) Childe Harold's Pilgrimage: A Critical, Composite Edition, Garland Pub., 1991.
- (Selector with Virginia Erdman) Blake's Selected Poems, Dover (New York, NY), 1995.
- (with others) The Romantic Movement: A Selective and Critical Bibliography for 1998, Locust Hill Press (West Cornwall, CT), 1999.
