= Blake: Prophet Against Empire =

Biography

- Author: David V. Erdman
- Cover artist: William Blake
- Language: English
- Genre: Literary criticism
- Publisher: Dover Publications
- Publication date: 1954
- Publication place: United States
- Media type: Print (hardback & paperback)
- Pages: 582
- ISBN: 0-486-26719-9
- OCLC: 22908171
- Dewey Decimal: 821/.7 20
- LC Class: PR4148.P6 E7 1991

Blake: Prophet Against Empire: A Poet's Interpretation of the History of His Own Times is a 1954 biography by David V. Erdman whose subject is the life and work of English poet and painter William Blake.

== Reception ==
Critic Northrop Frye has described the book as a work full of knowledge of the meaning of Blake's Prophecies and the first to make a consistent use of the primary sources of historical scholarship.

The book recounts the social history of England as seen through Blake's eyes, starting with the peaceful years of the 1760s, which Blake regarded, in his childhood, as time of innocence. Erdman covers the major events such as the American Revolution, the Gordon riots, the French Revolution, the policies of the Pitt government and the famine in England. He states that Blake was far from being an abstract or vague poet, but was a concrete one, whose social environment helped shape both his most famous and obscure works.

Jacob Bronowski stated: "Blake: Prophet Against Empire is the most important book that has been written about Blake... it expounded the view of Blake as a poet of social vision and human protest."

== See also ==
- Harold Bloom
- Fearful Symmetry
