= An Island in the Moon =

Prose by William Blake

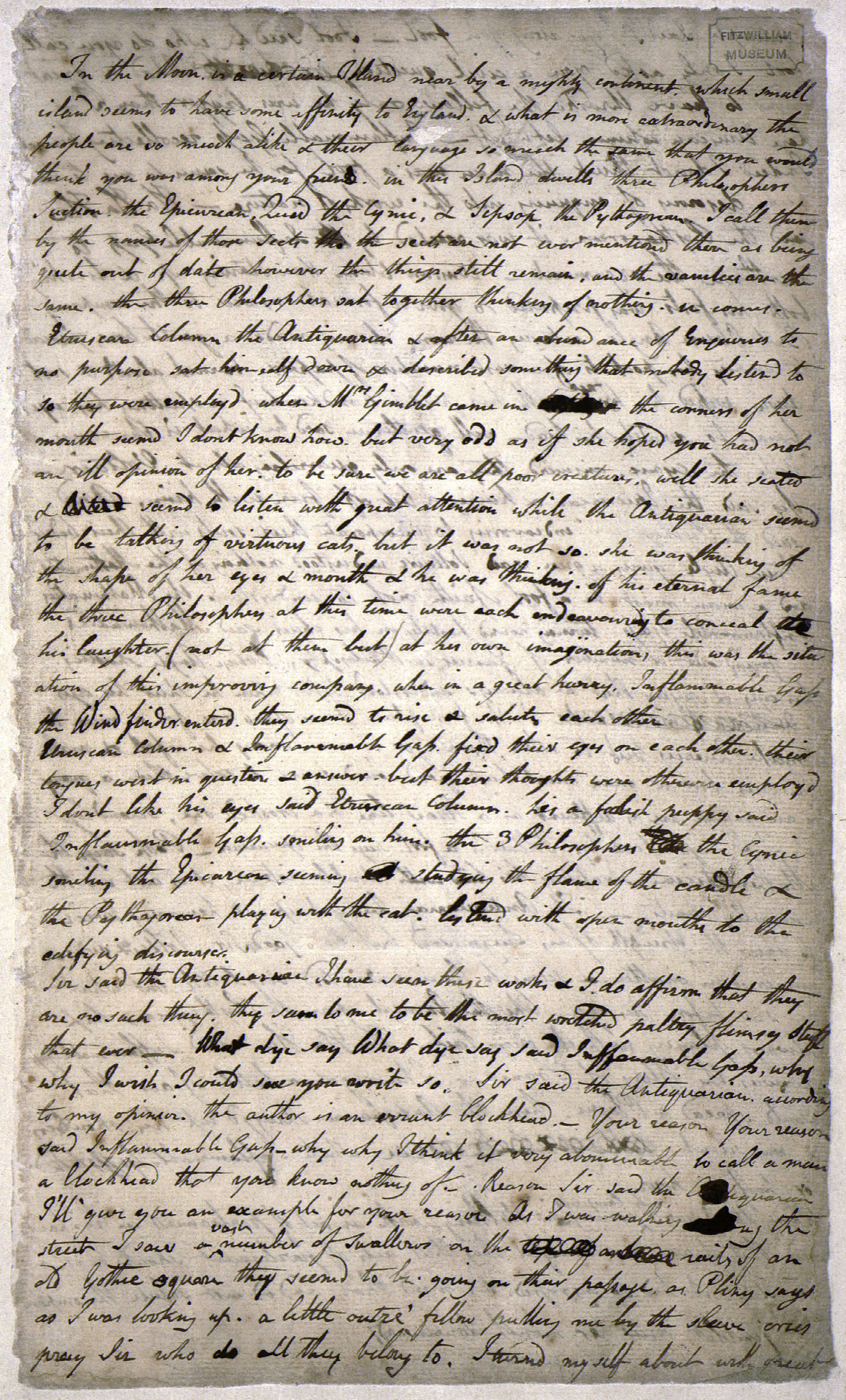
Page 1 of the only known manuscript of An Island in the Moon

An Island in the Moon is the name generally assigned to an untitled, unfinished prose satire by William Blake, written in late 1784. Containing early versions of three poems later included in Songs of Innocence (1789) and satirising the "contrived and empty productions of the contemporary culture", An Island demonstrates Blake's increasing dissatisfaction with convention and his developing interest in prophetic modes of expression. Referred to by William Butler Yeats and E. J. Ellis as "Blake's first true symbolic book," it also includes a partial description of Blake's soon-to-be-realised method of illuminated printing. The piece was unpublished during Blake's lifetime, and survives only in a single manuscript copy, residing in the Fitzwilliam Museum, in the University of Cambridge.

== Background ==
The overriding theory as to the main impetus behind An Island is that it allegorises Blake's rejection of the bluestocking society of Harriet Mathew, who, along with her husband, Reverend Anthony Stephen Mathew organised 'poetical evenings' to which came many of Blake's friends (such as John Flaxman, Thomas Stothard and Joseph Johnson) and, on at least one occasion, Blake himself. The Mathews had been behind the publication in 1783 of Blake's first collection of poetry, Poetical Sketches, but by 1784, Blake had supposedly grown weary of their company and the social circles in which they moved, and chose to distance himself from them. This theory can be traced back to an 1828 'Biographical Sketch' of Blake by his friend in later life, the painter J. T. Smith, published in the second volume of Smith's biography of Joseph Nollekens, Nollekens and his times. Smith's references to the Mathew family's association with Blake were taken up and elaborated upon by Blake's first biographer, Alexander Gilchrist, in his 1863 biography Life of William Blake, Pictor Ignotus., and from that point forth, the prevailing belief as to the primary background of An Island is that it dramatises Blake's disassociation from the social circles in which he found himself.

Critical work in the second half of the twentieth century, however, has often challenged the assumption that An Island originated in Blake's rejection of a specific social circle. Foremost amongst such work is that of David V. Erdman, who suggests instead that the main background to the An Island is Blake's belief in his own imminent financial success. In early 1784, Blake opened a print shop at No. 27 Broad Street with James Parker, alongside whom he had served as an apprentice to the engraver James Basire during the 1770s. At the time, engraving was becoming an extremely lucrative trade, accruing both wealth and respectability for many of its practitioners, and Erdman believes that the increasing prosperity for engravers in the early 1780s represents the most important background to An Island, arguing that the confidence which Blake and Parker must have felt informs the content more so than any sense of social rejection; "the kind of envy that breeds satire is that of the artist and artisan who is anticipating the taste of success and is especially perceptive of the element of opportunism." Erdman also sees as important the fact that the character based on Blake, Quid the Cynic, partially outlines a new method of printing, not unlike Blake's own, as yet unrealised, illuminated printing. Quid argues that he will use this new method of printing to outdo the best-known and most successful of artists and writers, such as Joshua Reynolds, William Woollett, Homer, John Milton and William Shakespeare. Behind this claim, argues Erdman, "lies the vision of a man [...] who begins to see a way to replace the division of labour with the harmony of One Man, to renew and join together the arts of poetry and painting without going outside his own shop and his own head." As such, Erdman contends that the primary background factor for An Island is the sense of anticipation and exuberance on the part of Blake, expectation for his new business venture and excitement regarding his new method of printing; An Island was thus borne from anticipation.

Nevertheless, writing in 2003, Nick Rawlinson, who also disagrees with the 'rejection theory', points out that "the general critical consensus is that the eleven surviving chapters of this unpublished manuscript form little more than Blake's whimsical attempt to satirise his friends, neighbours and fellow attendees of 27 Rathbone Place, the intellectual salon of the Reverend and Mrs AS Mathew; a kind of pleasing cartoon wallpaper on which he couldn't resist scrawling a few grotesque caricatures of his favourite scientific and philosophic bugbears."

== Manuscript and date ==
Due to the nature of the revisions in the only existing manuscript copy of An Island, it is generally agreed amongst scholars that the manuscript is not the original, but was a copy made by Blake. Blake seems to have worked on the eighteen-page MS over eight sittings, as there are eight different types of ink used throughout. The manuscript also contains many handwritten corrections in Blake's handwriting.

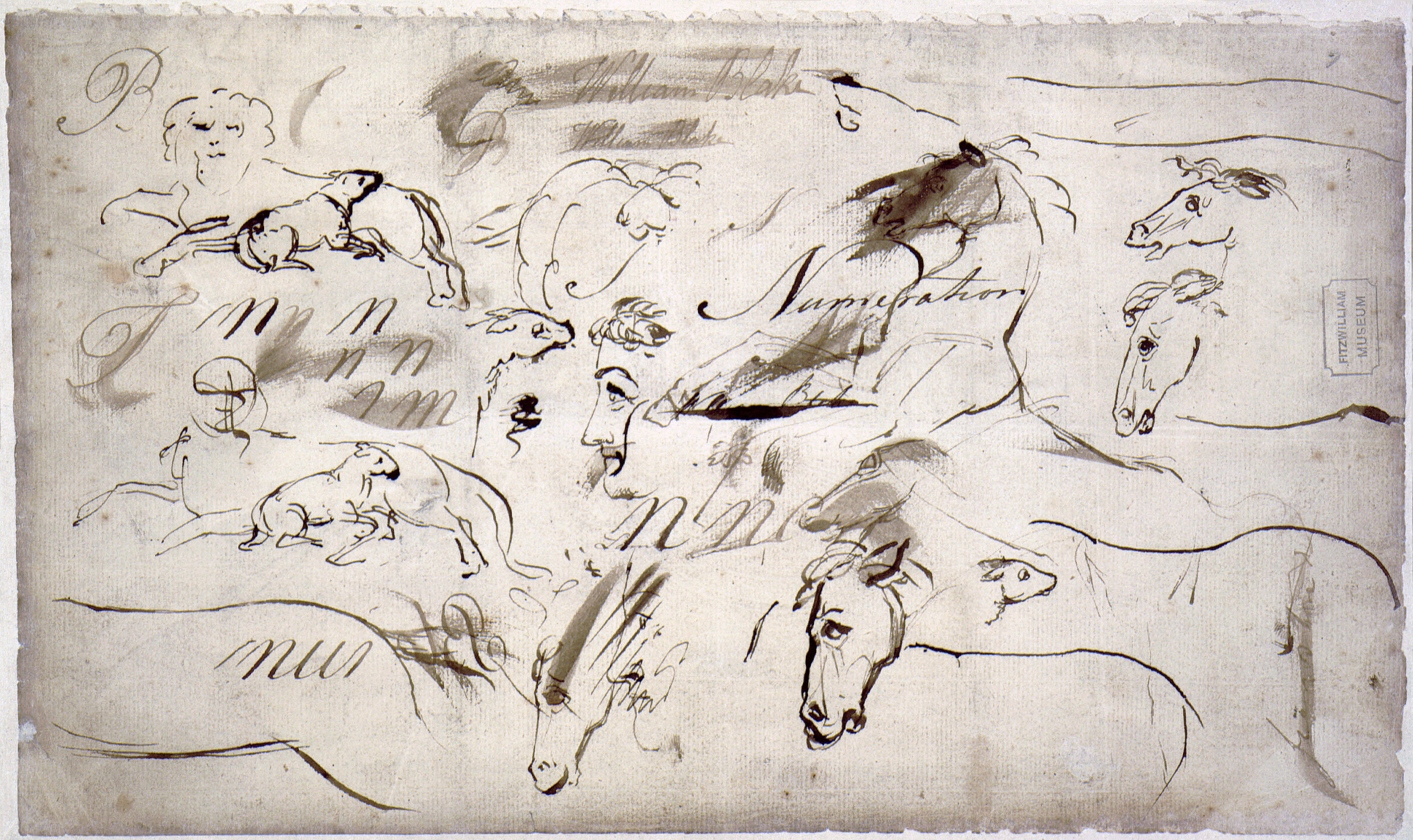
Page 18 of the only known manuscript of An Island in the Moon, containing random words and small illustrations

Also of interest is that on the last page of the MS are found numerous small pencil drawings of horses, lambs, lions and two human profiles. Additionally, the word "Numeration" has been written in the centre of the page, the word "Lamb" in tiny script between the two human profiles (partly obscured by a large "N"), and two signatures of Blake himself at the top of the page. Also present are various random letters (especially the letter "N") which may be examples of Blake's attempts to master mirror writing, a skill which was necessary for his work as an engraver. However, it is thought that at least some of the sketches and lettering on this page could have been by Blake's brother, Robert; "the awkwardness and redundancy of some of the work, the bare geometry of the head of the large lion in the lower pair of animals in the upper left quadrant of the page, and the heavy overdrawing on some of the other animals are among the features that may possibly reflect Robert's attempts to draw subjects that had been set as exercises for him by older brother William, and, in some instances, corrected by one of them."

Although the MS contains no date, due to certain topical references, An Island is generally believed to have been composed in late 1784. For example, there is a reference to the Great Balloon Ascension of September 15, when England's first airship rose from the Artillery Ground in Finsbury, watched by 220,000 Londoners. Other topical allusions include references to a performing monkey called Mr. Jacko, who appeared at Astley's Amphitheatre in Lambeth in July, a performing pig called Toby the Learned Pig, a Handel festival in Westminster Abbey in August, lectures on phlogiston, exhibitions of the microscope, and the Golden Square parties of Chevalier d'Eon.

Especially important in dating the text is Miss Gittipin's reference to Miss Filligree; "theres Miss Filligree work she goes out in her coaches & her footman & her maids & Stormonts & Balloon hats & a pair of Gloves every day & the sorrows of Werter & Robinsons & the Queen of Frances Puss colour." Stormonts were a type of hat popular in the early 1780s but had fallen out of fashion by 1784. Balloon bonnets (linen cases stuffed with hair) had become extremely popular by late 1784, as had Robinson hats and gowns (named after the poet and actress Mary Robinson). The mention of Werter is also a reference to a hat, not the 1774 novel. The balloon bonnet and the Robinson hat were in vogue from late 1783 to late 1784, when they overlapped slightly with the increasing popularity of the Werter. By mid-1785, however, all three had fallen out of fashion. This serves to situate An Island in late 1783-late 1784, and taken in tandem with the topical references, seems to confirm a date of the latter half of 1784.

An Island was unpublished during Blake's lifetime, and there is no evidence that it ever got beyond the MS stage. Extracts were first published in The Light Blue, Volume II (1867), a literary magazine published by Cambridge University, however, it has been suggested that perhaps Blake never intended for An Island to be published at all. Speaking of the sketches and poetry in Blake's Notebook, John Sampson writes they "are in the nature of rough jottings, sometimes mere doggerel set down from whim or to relieve a mood, and never probably [...] intended to see the light in cold print. Such without doubt is the fragment known as An Island in the Moon." Peter Ackroyd agrees with this suggestion, strongly believing that Blake never intended the piece to be read by the public.

The provenance of the MS is unknown prior to 1893 when it was acquired by Charles Fairfax Murray, who gave it to the Fitzwilliam Museum in 1905. At some stage prior to that time, at least one page was removed or lost, as page seventeen does not follow directly from page sixteen. A diagonal pencil inscription at the bottom of page seventeen, not in Blake's hand, reads, "a leaf is evidently missing before this one."

== Form ==
The actual form of An Island in the Moon is difficult to pin down. Geoffrey Keynes classifies it as "an incomplete burlesque novel." Martha W. England compares it to an "afterpiece", one-act satirical plays which were popular in London at the time. Alicia Ostriker calls it simply a "burlesque." Peter Ackroyd refers to it as a "satirical burlesque," and also likens it to an afterpiece. Northrop Frye, S. Foster Damon and David V. Erdman all refer to it as simply a "prose satire." Frye elaborates upon this definition, calling it "a satire on cultural dilettantism."

Erdman argues that the piece is a natural progression from Blake's previous work; "out of the sly ironist and angry prophet of Poetical Sketches emerges the self professed Cynic of An Island." Indeed, Erdman argues that Quid is an evolution of the character of 'William his man' from the unfinished play King Edward the Third, often interpreted as being a self-portrait of Blake himself.

Martha W. England also believes it represents part of Blake’s artistic development and is something of a snapshot of his search for an authentic artistic voice; "we can watch a great metrist and a born parodist searching for his tunes, trying out dramatic systems and metrical systems, none of which were to enslave him. Here he cheerfully takes under his examining eye song and satire, opera and plague, surgery and pastoral, Chatterton and science, enthusiasm and myth, philanthropy and Handelian anthem, the Man in the Street and those children whose nursery is the street – while he is making up his mind what William Blake shall take seriously [...] here, a master ironist flexes his vocal cords with a wide range of tone."

Similarly, Robert N. Essick, Joseph Viscomi and Morris Eaves see it as foreshadowing much of Blake's later work; "An Island in the Moon underscores the importance of the extensive stretches of humour and satire that show up frequently among his other writings. So, although Blake left it orphaned, untitled, and unfinished in a heavily revised manuscript, Island is in some sense a primary literary experiment for him, setting the undertone of much to follow."

An Island has no coherent, overall structure, and no plot whatsoever, being instead a broad satire. According to Ackroyd, "it is not a generalised satire on a Swiftian model; it stays too close to [Blake's] own world for that." As such, it is primarily composed of snatches of trivial conversation and witticisms, interspersed with songs and ballads. In this sense, it is structured similarly to Samuel Foote's improvised series of dramas Tea at the Haymarket, which lacked a definitive form so as to get around licensing regulations. England believes that Blake was consciously borrowing from Foote's style in composing An Island and as such, it is an "anti-play."

Nick Rawlinson agrees with England's assessment, although he feels that Samuel Foote may have been more of an influence than England allows for. Rawlinson reads the piece as primarily about reading itself, and the social implications of certain types of reading; "inside the apparently random concoction of prose, song and slapstick [...] lies an extraordinary, almost dazzling examination of the relationship between our habits of reading and the society they produce [...] Blake consistently and consciously foregrounds how our understanding of our society, our voices and even our perceptions are governed by our habits of reading [...] An Island contains a deliberate and careful plan to challenge [social] misreadings by teaching us how to read the world comically. It is nothing less than a degree course in comic Vision." Rawlinson argues that the literary references in the text are structured to mirror a 1707 Cambridge University pamphlet entitled A Method of Instructing Pupils (a guide on how to teach Philosophy). As such Rawlinson feels An Island is best described as "philosoparody."

== Characters ==
Many of the characters in An Island are parodies of Blake's friends and acquaintances, although there is considerable critical disagreement as to whom some characters represent. Indeed, some scholars question the usefulness of trying to discover whom any of them represent. Northrop Frye, for example, argues "the characters are not so much individuals as representatives of the various types of "reasoning" which are satirised." Peter Ackroyd also suggests that understanding whom the characters represent is less important than understanding the satire at the heart of the piece. Similarly, Nick Rawlinson argues that trying to attach the characters to specific people "limits the scope of the work to the eighteenth-century equivalent of a scurrilous email [...] it is reasonable to assume that the various characters stand for something more than just amusing personality sketches [...] It may be more helpful to see the characters as a reflection not just of a real person but also of an attitude Blake wishes to question."

Nevertheless, much critical work has been done on endeavouring to unravel which real-life person is behind each of the fictional characters.

- Quid the Cynic – based on Blake; represents cynicism and doubt; S. Foster Damon calls him "a lusty caricature of Blake himself [...] a poet who characteristically runs down those he admires most." Rawlinson suggests his name may be derived from the word 'Quidnunc'; a popular term in the eighteenth century for a busybody and know-it-all.
- Suction the Epicurean – based on Blake's brother, Robert; hates mathematics and science, and lives instead by his feelings. Damon believes he represents "the philosophy of the senses" and is "an all-absorbing atheist." Rawlinson suggests he may be a composite of Robert Blake and the print seller Jemmy Whittle. Suction is an Epicurean, a philosophical school despised by Blake, because of its rejection of the importance of the spirit, and reliance on materialism, which he associated with Francis Bacon. Circa 1808, Blake would write, "Bacon is only Epicurus over again."
- Sipsop the Pythagorean – Geoffrey Keynes suggests that Sipsop is based on the neoplatonist Thomas Taylor with whose work Blake was familiar. Keynes is supported in this by Alicia Ostriker. However, David V. Erdman, disputes this theory and instead suggests that Sipsop is based on William Henry Mathew, eldest son of Anthony Stephen Mathew. Erdman bases this argument on the fact that William Henry was apprenticed to the surgeon John Hunter, who is represented in An Island by Jack Tearguts, to whom Sipsop is apprenticed. On the other hand, Nancy Bogen believes that Sipsop is based on John Abernethy. Sipsop is often posited as representing the science rejected by Suction, but Damon argues this cannot be so, as such science is represented by Inflammable Gass. To Damon's mind, this leaves Sipsop with something of an undefined role. As a Pythagorean, Sipsop is ideologically the opposite of Suction the Epicurean; Pythagoreanism embraces the mysticism that Epicureanism explicitly rejects. Robert Schofield identifies this figure as Erasmus Darwin, one of the chief members of the Lunar Society, an informal club of scientific philosophers that held meetings on the night of the full moon. Blake had met Darwin and Joseph Priestley (another Lunar Society member) at Joseph Johnson's home and had engraved an illustration in Darwin's The Botanic Garden, a lengthy scientific poem that used mythological images to explain scientific discoveries.
- Steelyard the Lawgiver – based on Blake's close friend and fellow artist John Flaxman.
- Inflammable Gass – Damon suggests he may be based on the scientist and philosopher Joseph Priestley, as Gass' reference to "flogiston" recalls Priestley's experiments with phlogiston, which were quite well-known at the time. G.E. Bentley reaches a similar conclusion, citing a demonstration given at the Free Masons Tavern on Great Queen Street during which some phosphorus ignited and destroyed the lamp containing it. Bentley believes that this incident may have formed the basis for the broken glass during an experiment in chapter 10. Erdman however, rejects this identification, arguing that there is no evidence Blake was familiar with either the demonstrations or the writings of Priestley. Instead, Erdman suggests that Gass may simply be a characteristic type representing all science in general. In 1951, Palmer Brown suggested that Gass may be based on the conjurer Gustavus Katterfelto, who was as famous as Priestley in London, and who carried out public experiments in Piccadilly. Although Erdman initially rejected Brown's theory, he changed his mind shortly before writing Blake: Prophet Against Empire, and ultimately came to support it. Another possibility, suggested by W.H. Stevenson, is William Nicholson, author of An Introduction to Natural Philosophy, for which Blake engraved the title page vignette in 1781. Other possibilities, suggested by Stanley Gardner, are the physician George Fordyce and the scientist Henry Cavendish. Rawlinson suggests Gass could, at least in part, be based on the botanist Joseph Banks.
- Obtuse Angle – generally agreed to be based on James Parker, Blake’s fellow apprentice during his time with Basire. George Mills Harper, however, believes that Angle is instead based on Thomas Taylor (Harper agrees with Erdman that Sipsop is not based on Taylor but on William Henry Mathew). Harper argues that Angle seems to be an educator, and his relationship with many of the other characters is that of a teacher and student. This is significant because there is evidence that Blake took lessons in Euclid under Taylor, hence Angle's apparent role as a teacher. Erdman supports this theory. Rawlinson suggests that Angle may be partially based on Blake's friend George Cumberland, as well as the antiquarian Francis Douce.
- Aradobo – based on either Joseph Johnson, the first publisher to employ Blake as a copy-engraver, or one of the bookseller Edward brothers (James, John and Richard). In 1784, James and John had opened a bookshop in Pall Mall, with Richard as their apprentice, and Blake would certainly have been familiar with the shop.
- Etruscan Column – Harper believes that Column is based on the antiquarian John Brand. However, Brylowe points out that the Greek antiquarianism Blake is mocking is more in line with the work of William Hamilton.
- Little Scopprell – Erdman suggests he may represent J. T. Smith, but he acknowledges that this is based on guesswork only.
- Tilly Lally – no known basis for this character, although he is often posited as representing elegance.
- Mrs. Nannicantipot – based on the poet and children's author Anna Laetitia Barbauld.
- Gibble Gabble – because she is married to Gass, she is usually seen as representing Joseph Priestley's real wife, Mary Priestley. However, there is some disagreement about whether Gass actually represents Priestley, and if not, then presumably, Gibble Gabble could no longer be posited as representing Mary.
- Mrs Gimblet – possibly based on Harriet Mathew. Rawlinson suggests she could be based on Charlotte Lennox.
- Mrs Gittipin – possibly based on Nancy Flaxman, John Flaxman's wife.
- Ms. Sigtagatist – Nancy Bogen suggests she is based on Harriet Mathew, but Erdman believes this is doubtful. The name "Sigtagatist" was first written "Sistagatist" in most places, but changed. Twice during the piece, she is sarcastically referred to as Mrs Sinagain; once by Tily Lally in Chapter 3^{d} ("Ill tell you what M^{rs} Sinagain I dont think theres any harm in it"), and once by the narrator in Chapter 4 ("Ah," said M^{rs} Sinagain. "I'm sure you ought to hold your tongue, for you never say any thing about the scriptures, & you hinder your husband from going to church").
- Jack Tearguts – mentioned only; based on the surgeon and lecturer John Hunter, whose name Blake wrote in the manuscript before replacing it with Jack Tearguts.
- Mr. Jacko – mentioned only; possibly based on portrait painter Richard Cosway; probably named after a famous performing monkey well known in London at the time.
- Mrs. Nann – mentioned only; Nancy Bogen believes she is based on Blake's wife, Catherine, but Erdman believes this is guesswork.

== Overview ==
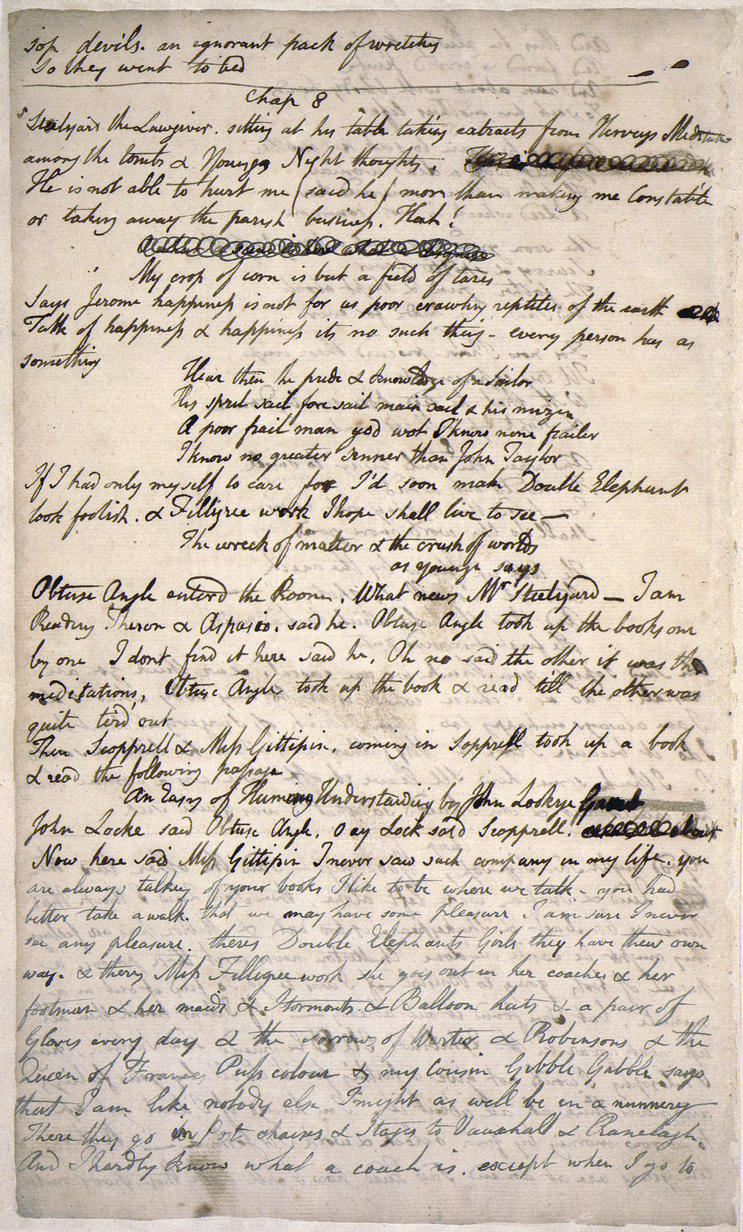
Page 8 of the only known manuscript of An Island in the Moon (note the different colour inks, indicating different periods of composition)

Chapter 1 begins with a promise by the narrator to engage the reader with an analysis of contemporary thought, "but the grand scheme degenerates immediately into nonsensical and ignorant chatter." A major theme in this chapter is that no one listens to anyone else; "Etruscan Column & Inflammable Gass fix'd their eyes on each other, their tongue went in question & answer, but their thoughts were otherwise employed." According to Erdman, "the contrast between appearance and reality in the realm of communication lies at the centre of Blake's satiric method." This chapter also introduces Blake's satiric treatment of the sciences and mathematics; according to Obtuse Angle, "Voltaire understood nothing of the Mathematics, and a man must be a fool ifaith not to understand the Mathematics."

Chapter 2^{d} is the shortest chapter in the piece and is only one sentence long. The entire chapter reads: "Tilly Lally the Siptippidist Aradobo, the dean of Morocco, Miss Gittipin & Mrs Nannicantipot, Mrs Sigtagatist Gibble Gabble the wife of Inflammable Gass – & Little Scopprell enter'd the room (If I have not presented you with every character in the piece call me *Arse—)"

Chapter 3^{d} introduces musical interludes, a technique which becomes increasingly important as the piece moves on. "Honour & Genius", sung by Quid, is a parody of a song in the James Harris pastoral The Spring (1762 – reissued in 1766 as Daphnis and Amaryllis). The satirical vein continues in this chapter during the discussion of "Phebus", when Obtuse Angle claims "he was the God of Physic, Painting, Perspective, Geometry, Geography, Astronomy, Cookery, Chymistry, Conjunctives, Mechanics, Tactics, Pathology, Phraseology, Theology, Mythology, Astrology, Osteology, Somatology, in short every art & science adorn'd him as beads round his neck."

Chapter 4 continues with the satire in the form of a debate between Inflammable Gass and Mrs. Sigtagatist. When Sigtagatist tells Gass that he should always attend church on Sundays, Gass declares, "if I had not a place of profit that forces me to go to church I'd see the parsons all hang'd a parcel of lying." Sigtigatist then proclaims "O, if it were not for churches & chapels I should not have liv'd so long." She then proudly recalls a figure from her youth, Minister Huffcap, who would "kick the bottom of the Pulpit out, with Passion, would tear off the sleeve of his Gown, & set his wig on fire & throw it at the people he'd cry & stamp & kick & sweat and all for the good of their souls."

Chapter 5 looks at the inanity of the society depicted, insofar as an intellectual discussion of the work of Chatterton between Obtuse Angle, Little Scopprell, Aradobo and Tilly Lally descends into farce; "Obtuse Angle said in the first place you thought he was not [a Mathematician] & then afterwards when I said he was not you thought he was not. Why I know that – Oh no sir I thought that he was not, but I ask'd to know whether he was. – How can that be said Obtuse Angle how could you ask & think that he was not – why said he. It came into my head that he was not. – Why then said Obtuse Angle you said that he was. Did I say so Law I did not think I said that – Did not he said Obtuse Angle Yes said Scopprell. But I meant said Aradobo I I I can't think Law Sir I wish you'd tell me, how it is." Northrop Frye refers to this incident as "farcical conversational deadlock."

Chapter 6 continues to intersperse songs amongst the prose. "When old corruption", sung by Quid, is a satire on the medical profession and may have been suggested by The Devil Upon Two Sticks (1768), a three-act comedic satire by Samuel Foote, which was itself based on the satirical Alain-René Lesage novel Le Diable boiteux (1707). The Devil Upon Two Sticks had been revived on the London stage in 1784, so it would have been topical at the time of writing. The poem also seems to parody parts of Book II of the John Milton epic Paradise Lost (1667), particularly the scenes outlining the genealogy of the sentries of the Gates of Hell, Sin and Death. Chapter 6 is also an important chapter for Suction, insofar as it is here he outlines his primary philosophy; "Ah hang your reasoning I hate reasoning I do every thing by my feelings." The satire in this section comes from Sipsop's discussion of the surgery of Jack Tearguts, and how his patients react; "Tho they cry ever so he'll Swear at them & keep them down with his fist & tell them that he'll scrape their bones if they don't lie still & be quiet." The inherent but unacknowledged irony here recalls Sigtagatist's proud recollection of Minister Huffcap in Chapter 4.

Chapter 7 sees Suction continue to espouse his philosophical beliefs; "Hang philosophy – I would not give a farthing for it do all by your feelings and never think at all about it." Similarly, Quid voices his own opinion of some of the most respected writers at the time; "I think that Homer is bombast & Shakespeare is too wild & Milton has no feelings they might be easily outdone Chatterton never writ those poems." In relation to this criticism, Damon comments, "he is merely repeating the conventional chatter of the critics, which was the exact opposite of what Blake actually thought."

Chapter 8 contains references to and quotes from many of the works Blake was exposed to and influenced by at a young age. These references include allusions to Saint Jerome, John Taylor's Urania, or his Heavenly Muse (1630), Abraham Cowley's translation of Anacreon's lyric poem "The Grasshopper" (1656), Henry Wotton's Reliquae Wottonianae (1685), John Locke's An Essay Concerning Human Understanding (1690), Joseph Addison's Cato, a Tragedy (1712), Edward Young's Night-Thoughts (1742) and James Hervey's Meditations and Contemplations (1746) and Theron and Aspasio (1755). The Jerome reference is found in Steelyard's comment "Says Jerome happiness is not for us poor crawling reptiles of the earth Talk of happiness & happiness its no such thing – every person has a something." The Taylor reference is Steelyard’s poem; "Hear then the pride & knowledge of a Sailor/His sprit sail fore sail main sail & his mizen/A poor frail man god wot I know none frailer/I know no greater sinner than John Taylor." Although Alicia Ostriker feels this is a reference to the preacher John Taylor, David Erdman argues that the lines closely parallel the opening of the poem Urania , and as such, the reference is more likely to the poet than the preacher. The Cowley reference is found in the poem "Phebe drest like beauties Queen", which contains the lines "Happy people who can be/In happiness compard with ye." Erdman believes this to be derived from the lines in Cowley's translation of Anacreon, "Happy Insect! What can be/In Happiness compar'd to thee?" The Wotton reference is found in Steelyard's "My crop of corn is but a field of tares;" John Sampson believes this to be a reference to the Chidiock Tichborne poem "Elegy" (1586), which Blake could have been familiar with from Wotton's Reliquae. Locke is mentioned when Scopprell picks up one of Steelyard's books and reads the cover, "An Easy of Huming Understanding by John Lookye Gent." Addison is referred to indirectly when Steelyard attributes the quote "the wreck of matter & the crush of worlds" to Edward Young, when it is actually from Addison's Cato. Both the reference to Young and Hervey's Meditations are found in the opening sentence of the chapter; "Steelyard the Lawgiver, sitting at his table taking extracts from Herveys Meditations among the tombs & Youngs Night thoughts." The Theron reference is found when Steelyard announces to Obtuse Angle that he is reading the book.

Chapter 9 includes several songs that seemingly have no real meaning, but which would rhythmically appeal to infants. For example, "This frog he would a wooing ride/Kitty alone Kitty alone/This frog he would a wooing ride/Kitty alone & I" was a real ditty popular in London at the time. Such songs possibly reflect Blake's childhood. Other songs in this chapter include "Lo the Bat with Leathern wing", which may be a combined parody of a line in Alexander Pope's An Essay on Man (1734); "Lo, the poor Indian", and a phrase in William Collins' "Ode to Evening"; "weak eyed bat/With short shrill shriek flits by on leathern wing." Satire is found in this chapter in the songs "Hail Matrimony made of Love", which condemns marriage, and may have been inspired by The Wife Hater by John Cleveland (1669). Satire is also present in "This city & this country", which mocks patriotism, and could be a parody of a patriotic ballad entitled "The Roast Beef of Old England" from Henry Fielding's play The Grub Street Opera (1731). This chapter also contains references to Thomas Sutton, founder of the Charterhouse School in 1611, the churchman Robert South and William Sherlock's A Practical Discourse upon Death (1689).

Chapter 10 concludes with Inflammable Gass accidentally releasing a "Pestilence", which he fears will kill everyone on the Island; "While Tilly Lally & Scopprell were pumping at the air pump Smack went the glass. Hang said Tilly Lally. Inflammable Gass turn'd short round & threw down the table & Glasses & Pictures & broke the bottles of wind, & let out the Pestilence. He saw the Pestilence fly out of the bottle & cried out while he ran out of the room. Go come out come out you are we are putrified, we are corrupted. our lungs are destroy'd with the Flogiston this will spread a plague all thro' the Island he was down stairs the very first on the back of him came all the others in a heap so they need not bidding go." However, no mention is made of the incident in the next chapter; a possible allusion to Blake's distrust of science.

Chapter 11 is seen as the most important chapter by many critics insofar as it contains early versions of "The Little Boy lost", "Holy Thursday", and "Nurse's Song", all of which would appear in Songs of Innocence in 1789. This chapter also includes an incomplete description of Blake's method of illuminated printing. The description begins in the middle, with at least one preceding page missing, as Quid explains his method to Mrs. Gittipin; "... them Illuminating the Manuscript-Ay said she that would be excellent. Then said he I would have all the writing Engraved instead of Printed & at every other leaf a high finish'd print all in three Volumes folio, & sell them a hundred pounds a piece. They would Print off two thousand then said she whoever will not have them will be ignorant fools & will not deserve to live." Damon has speculated that Blake may have destroyed the missing page(s) so as to preserve the secret of his method.

== Adaptations ==
An Island in the Moon has been adapted for the stage twice. In 1971, Roger Savage adapted it into a two-act play entitled Conversations with Mr. Quid, which was staged at the University of Edinburgh as part of a week-long Blake conference.

The second adaptation was in 1983 when Blake scholar Joseph Viscomi adapted it into a one-act musical under the title An Island in the Moon: A Satire by William Blake, 1784. The piece was staged in the Goldwin Smith Hall on Cornell University's Central Campus as part of the Cornell Blake Symposium, Blake: Ancient and Modern. Viscomi wrote the adaptation himself, which included musical versions of "The Garden of Love" from Songs of Innocence and of Experience (1794) and "O why was I born with a different face", a poem from a letter written by Blake to Thomas Butts in 1803. Original music was composed by Margaret LaFrance. Department of Theatre lecturers Evamarii Johnson and Robert Gross directed and produced, respectively. Viscomi consolidated all of the events of the piece into a single night in a tavern (owned by Tilly Lally, who also doubled as the narrator), and reduced the cast from fifteen to fourteen by removing Mrs Nannicantipot. Viscomi also moved the last section to earlier in the play, and thus the play ends with the various songs from Chapter 11 which would appear in Songs of Innocence.
