= Žudije =

Žudije are the guardians of the tomb of Christ (In Croatian: čuvari Kristova groba) which is a predominantly Catholic tradition in the region of Dalmatia, Croatia. Their name is of Greco-Roman origin and most probably means a Jew. Žudije are usually consisted of 12 guardians led by commander which is called "Juda" as 13th member. Participants are generally dressed in Roman uniforms, but sometimes the clothing of sailors or various traditional costumes are chosen.

The tradition begins on Holy Thursday when Žudije approach the altar where they stand guard and take shifts until Easter Vigil at midnight (night between Holy Saturday and Eastern Sunday) when they fall to the ground upon hearing bells announcing the resurrection of Christ during the Holy Mass. A Žudija can be a young man who has received all the sacraments and serves as an example in his town.

== History ==
Tradition in Croatia was first documented in Metković (then Austria-Hungary), in the beginning of the 19th century as it was brought there by Ante Gluščević from the Italian town of Loreto and subsequently it spread all over the Neretva basin eventually encompassing a large part of Dalmatia. First Žudije were established in 1857 in the Parish of Saint Elias in Metković which makes them the oldest association of a kind. In 2007 they celebrated the 150 anniversary of their existence.

Over time, each parish has introduced their own customs so that today these traditions differ in their specifics depending on the parish. One of the oldest groups of Žudije comes from the little town of Tisno where this tradition has also been cherished for more than 150 years. Worth mentioning are also Žudije from Vrlika where this tradition is cherished not only by local Catholics, but an Orthodox minority as well.

== Vodice ==
Arguably the most popular Žudije come from the coastal town of Vodice where it became a tourist attraction and the city's most recognizable brand which is known even outside Croatia. Children from the kindergarten in Vodice are also dressed in Roman uniforms and guard the tomb of Christ on Good Friday before being involved in a traditional Eastern breakfast organized by the Tourist Board of the town.

=== Festival of Žudije ===
In attempt to preserve this tradition, Žudije from Vodice have been organizing the meeting of a large number of their groups from all over Dalmatia since 2001 which they initially named "Susret žudija Dalmacije" (eng: Meeting of Žudije from Dalmatia). As the number of participants has increased, the original name has been changed several times and now it bears the name "Festival Žudija" (eng: Festival of Žudije).

Meetings were held in Vodice until 2006 when the decision was made that the festival would be hosted in a different parish each year so that more people have the opportunity to get acquainted with the customs of other parishes. As the place of its origin, Vodice retained the honor to host the festival every 6 years.
