= Holy Thursday (disambiguation) =

Holy Thursday or Maundy Thursday is the traditional observance day of the Maundy and Last Supper of Jesus, i.e., the Thursday falling before Easter.

Holy Thursday may also refer to:

- Feast of the Ascension, also called Holy Thursday, traditionally celebrated 40 days after Easter
- "Holy Thursday" (Songs of Experience), a 1794 poem by William Blake in Songs of Experience
- "Holy Thursday" (Songs of Innocence), a 1789 poem by William Blake in Songs of Innocence
