= Harriet Mathew =

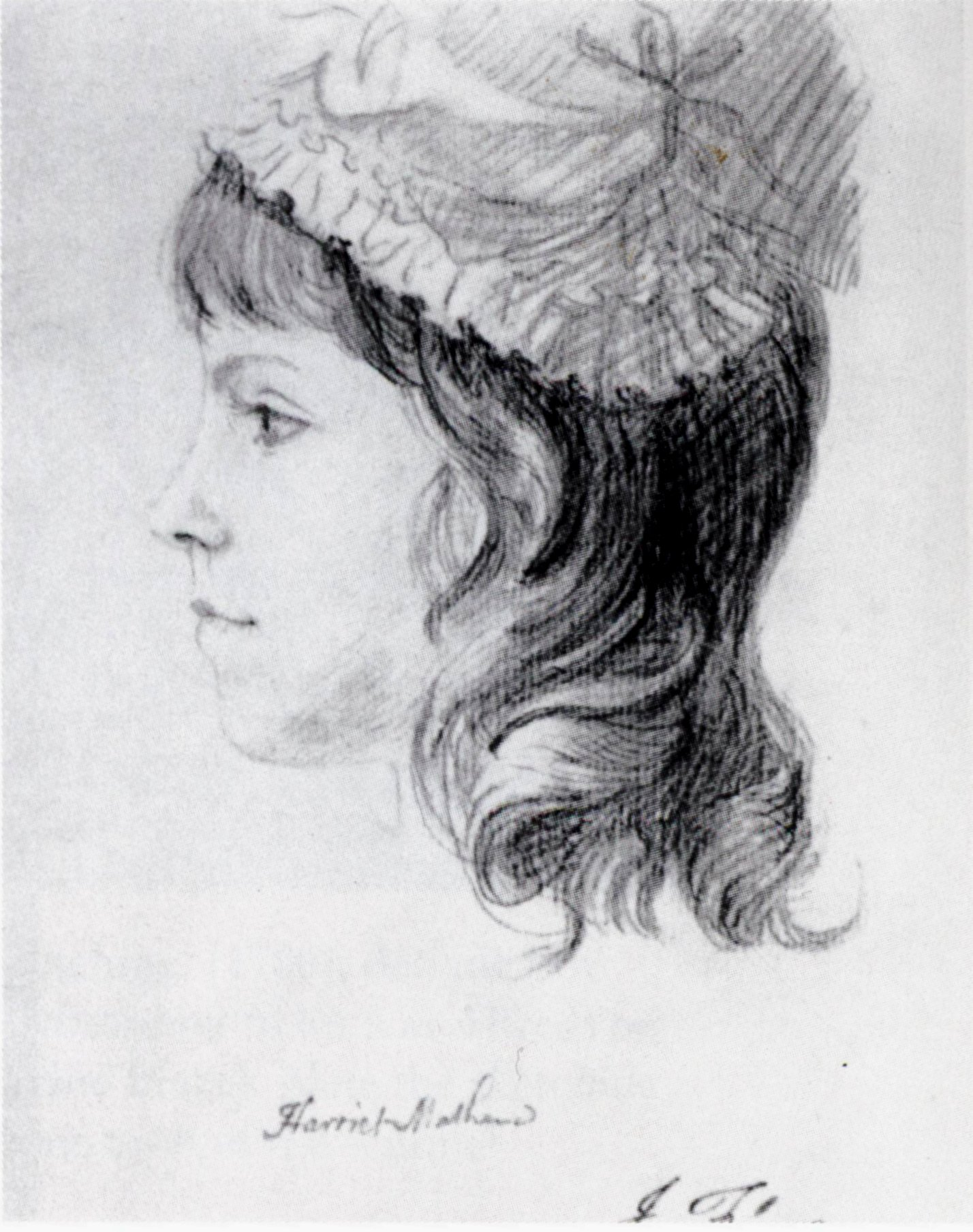
Harriet Mathew by John Flaxman c. 1783

Harriet Mathew was an 18th-century London socialite and patron of the arts, who is considered an important early patron of John Flaxman and William Blake. She was the wife of the Reverend Anthony Stephen Mathew (also known by the pseudonym Henry Mathew).

Alexander Gilchrist, in his Life of Blake, writes of her:

"Alas! for tenure of mortal Fame! This lady ranked among the distinguished blue-stockings of her day; was once known to half the Town, the polite and lettered part thereof, as the agreeable, fascinating, spirituelle Mrs. Mathew, as, in brief, one of the most 'gifted and elegant' of women. As she does not, like her fair comrades, still flutter about the bookstalls among the half-remembered all-unread, and as no lettered contemporary has handed down her portrait, she has disappeared from us. Yet the lady, with her husband, the Rev. Henry Mathew, merit remembrance from the lovers of Art, as the first discoverers and fosterers of the genius of Flaxman, when a boy not yet in teens, and his introducer to more opulent patrons.... She was an encourager of musicians, a kind friend to young artists. To all of promising genius the doors of her house, 27, Rathbone Place, were open."

John Thomas Smith was introduced to Blake by Mrs Mathew and heard him read and sing his poetry on several occasions; it was here that the qualities of his voice and the reception of his audience were recorded in his contemporary biographical notes. Smith also notes she was "extremely zealous in promoting the celebrity of Blake" and was responsible, via her husband and his friends, for the printing of his Poetical Sketches (1783). Blake later satirised the Mathews, and the Johnson Circle and dinners, in 'An Island in the Moon'.

A vaguely detailed story regarding the Mathews early patronage of Flaxman was first given by J. T. Smith and repeated by Blake and Flaxman's biographers. A collection of sketches bearing titles of 'Harriet Mathew' and her relations have been attributed to Flaxman.

== Issue ==
- Henry William Mathew
