= Anthony Stephen Mathew =

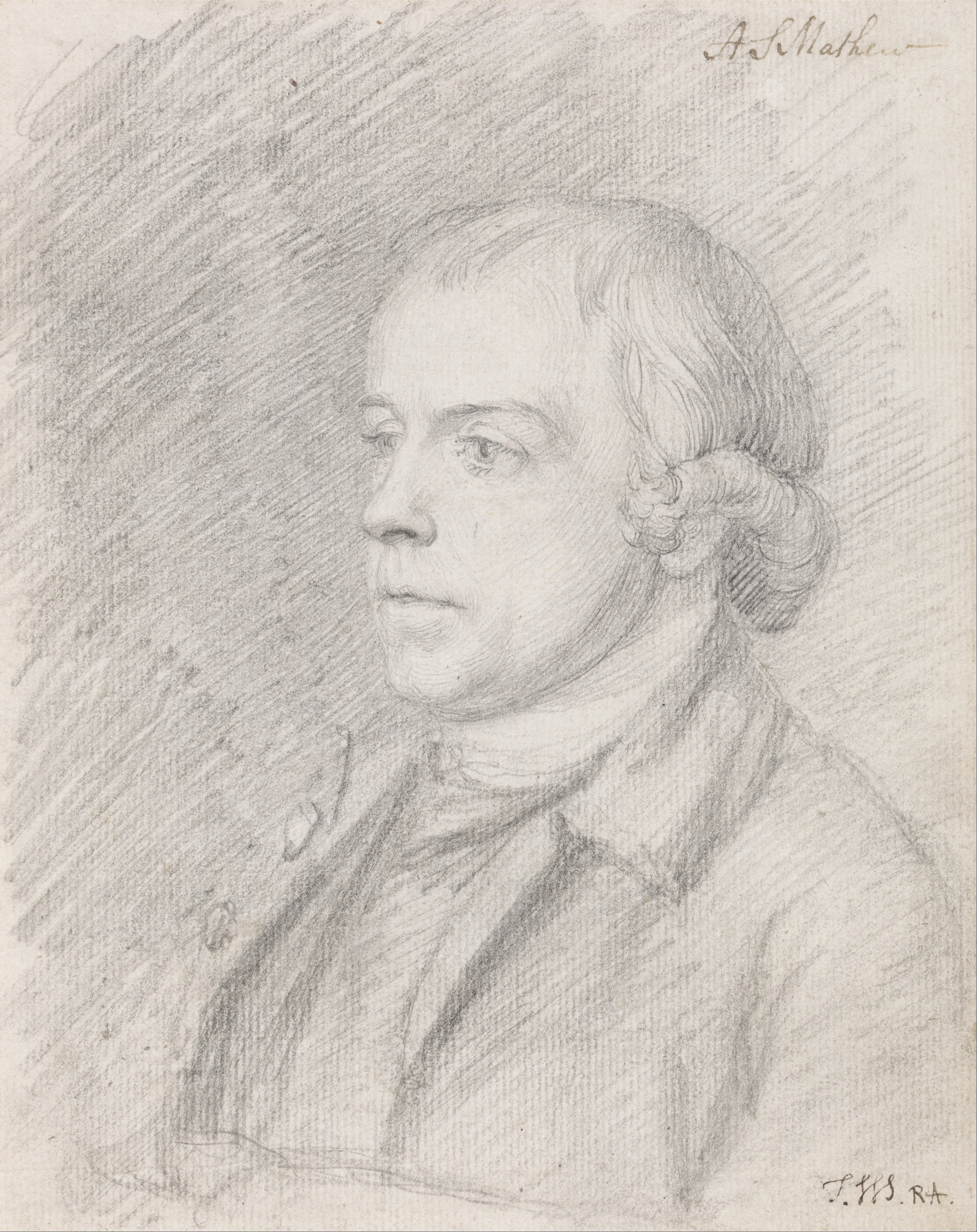
Portrait of Mathew by John Flaxman

Anthony Stephen Mathew (1734–1824) was a cleric the Church of England. He and his wife Harriet Mathew are most notable for their friendship and support of John Flaxman and William Blake and their gathering of intellectuals and artists salon in their house at Rathbone Place.

Importantly, he was one of the original supporters of Blake's first collection of work Poetical Sketches (1783). Blake later satirised the Mathews, and the Johnson Circle, in the collection An Island in the Moon.

== Career ==
At the age of 17, Mathew entered the college Peterhouse at Cambridge University, subsequently entering the Church of England. Anthony Stephen Mathew was the first incumbent of Percy Chapel, Charlotte Street, London starting in 1766 through 1804. He was succeeded by Thomas Beaseley.

Throughout his career in the church, he was rector of Glooston, Leicestershire from 1781 and the Duke of Buccleuch gave him the rectorship of Broughton, Northamptonshire in 1790 which he held until he died. While in London, he was also a joint lecturer at St. Martin-in-the-Fields, London.

== Issue ==
- Henry William Mathew
