= Nancy Bogen =

American writer (born 1932)

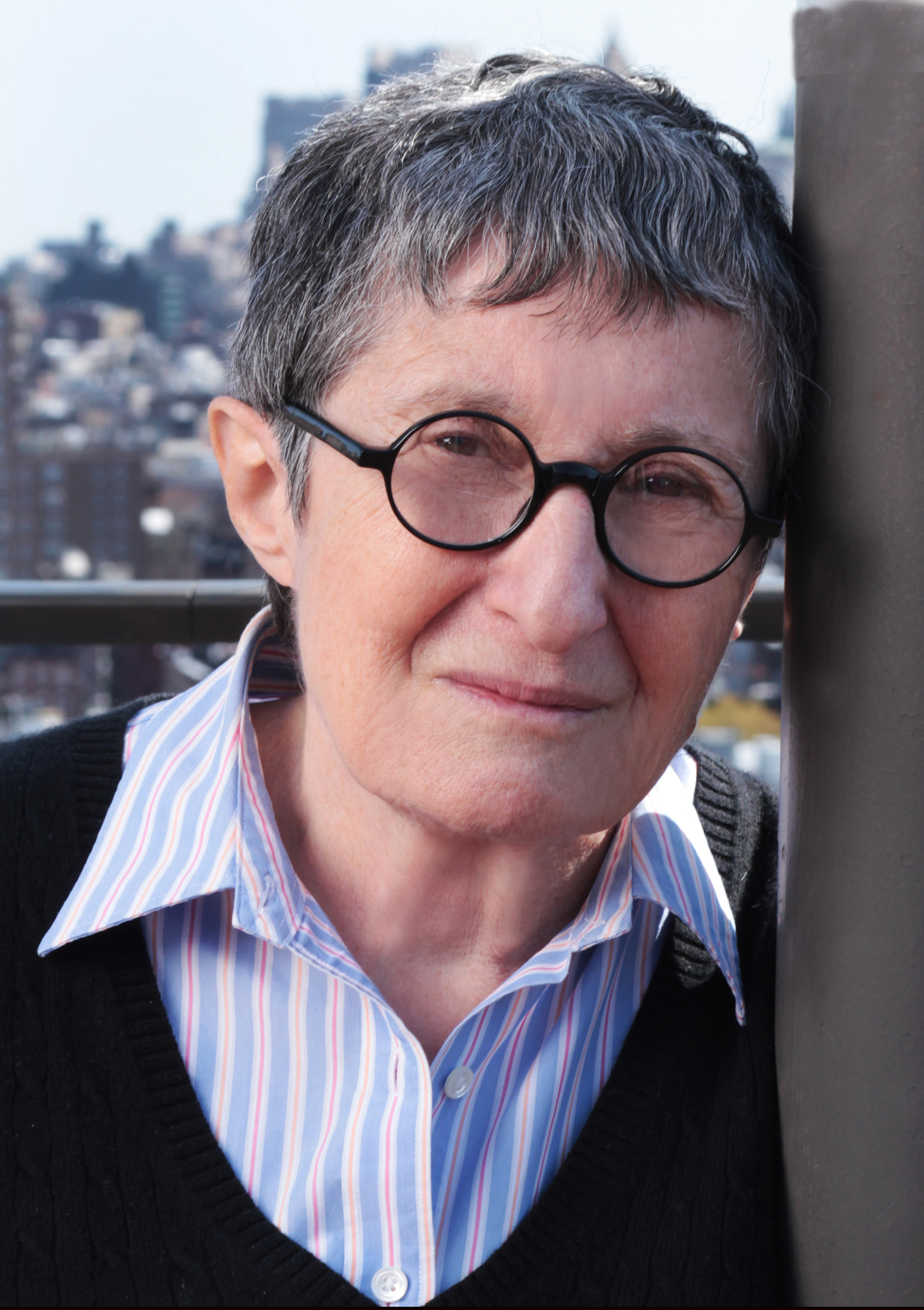
- Born: April 24, 1932 (age 94); New York City, New York, US
- Education: Columbia University (Ph.D.)
- Occupations: author-scholar, mixed media producer, and digital artist
- Spouse: Arnold Greissle-Schönberg
- Writing career
- Language: English
- Notable works: Klytaimnestra Who Stayed at Home; Bobe Mayse, A Tale of Washington Square; Bagatelle·Guinevere by Felice Rothman; How to Write Poetry; Be a Poet!
- Notable awards: Eric Hoffer Heritage Award; Next Generation Indie Book Awards Poetry Category; Scholar's Library of the MLA

Nancy Bogen (born April 24, 1932) is an American author-scholar, mixed media producer, and digital artist.

Bogen has to her credit three serious novels of ideas: Klytaimnestra Who Stayed at Home (1980); Bobe Mayse, A Tale of Washington Square (1993); and the space satire Bagatelle·Guinevere by Felice Rothman (1995). Distinguished literary critic John Gardner made a spirited defense of Klytaimnestra after it came out. When a reviewer in Library Journal relegated Bogen's novel to the “popular fiction rack” with his own work, Gardner protested that Klytaimnestra merited a more respectful classification.

Also of note are Bogen’s Arco manual How to Write Poetry (1980) and Be a Poet! (2007), a considerable expansion of the initial work and a winner of numerous small press awards.

In 1997, Bogen began to fashion works in which she rhythmically synchronized her digitized photos to readings of poetry or performances of New Music. Her early works in this vein were later published online on Vimeo and videoart.net.

== Early career ==
Bogen began publishing scholarly articles on William Blake in 1966, while still a doctoral candidate at Columbia University’s Graduate School in the Arts and Sciences, and presently has nine of them to her credit, including her Master’s essay on Jakob Böhme and Blake’s “Tiriel.” Her doctoral dissertation, William Blake’s Book of Thel: A Critical Edition with a New Interpretation, was published by Brown University Press (later part of the University Press of New England) in 1971 and was named to the Scholar’s Library of the Modern Language Association. A more recent article by Bogen on Wallace Stevens’s “Thirteen Ways of Looking at a Blackbird” appeared in The Explicator in 2004.

== Later work ==
In 1997, following her retirement as Professor of English from the College of Staten Island-CUNY, Bogen founded The Lark Ascending, a performance group dedicated to bringing the “best that was thought and said in the past” to appreciative audiences. Highlights were The Great Debate in Hell, a reading of Books I and II of John Milton’s Paradise Lost, and the complete Samson Agonistes. Cast members were all veterans of the New York theater, including Russell Oberlin and Broadway actor Maurice Edwards.

While with The Lark Ascending, Bogen began to fashion works in which she rhythmically synchronized her digitized photos to readings of poetry or performances of New Music. Her works in this vein are published online on Vimeo and videoart.net: Textur, with music by Austrian composer Katharina Klement; Kassandra, a Reverie, with music by Romanian composer Dinu Ghezzo; Black on Black / 13, with music by American composer Richard Brooks; Going...gone, with music by American composer John Bilotta; the farce A Noiseless, Patient Spider, with Russell Oberlin as the reader, Blackie the Blackbird as the Spider, and Schubert's "Die Forelle" arranged for vocal quartet; and Against the Cold, with music by American composer Joseph Pehrson. Also on vimeo are: My Country 'Tis, with music by American composer Harold Seletsky; Licorice Moments with music by American composer Hubert Howe; Verlaine Variations with music by American composer Elodie Lauten; and Mein Lebenslauf by Georg Schoenberg, oldest son of Arnold Schoenberg by his first wife Mathilde von Zemlinsky.

A lifelong New Yorker and a resident of Greenwich Village since the 1970s, Bogen is married to Arnold Greissle-Schönberg, oldest living grandson of composer Arnold Schönberg. Her husband is the nephew of Georg Schönberg, also a composer, whose musical works Bogen premiered through the years at The Lark Ascending events and has vigorously tried to promote in other ways. She is the “author with” of the English version of Arnold Greissle-Schönberg’s biography.

== Works by Nancy Bogen ==
=== Books ===
Fiction

Klytaimnestra Who Stayed at Home. Roanoke, Va: Lintel, 1988 (cloth). NY: Twickenham, 1980. (trade paper)*

Bobe Mayse, A Tale of Washington Square. NYC, NY: Twickenham, 1993. (cloth & trade paper)*

Bagatelle·Guinevere by Felice Rothman. NYC, NY: Twickenham, 1995. (cloth & trade paper)*

_{* Reviews are available at www.twickenhampress.org}

Criticism and Text

William Blake's Book of Thel: A Critical Edition with a New Interpretation. Providence: Brown University Press, 1971.

How to Write Poetry. NYC, NY: Simon & Schuster, 1990; 1991; MacMillan, 1995.*

Be a Poet!. NYC, NY: Twickenham, 2007.*

_{* Reviews are available at www.twickenhampress.org}

=== Critical and Scholarly Articles and Reviews ===
"A New Listing of Blake's Poetical Sketches." ELN 3 (3/66), 194-96.

Review of two of Bogen's poems in Poet & Critic, III (Spring 1967).

"Blake's Debt to Gillray." ANQ, 6 (11/67), 35-39.

"Blake on the Ohio." N & Q, NS 15 (1/68), 19-20.

"Blake's 'Island in the moon' Revisited." Satire Newsletter, 5 (Spring 1968), 110-17.

"The Problem of William Blake's Early Religion." The Personalist (8/68), 509-22.

"'Tiriel': A New Interpretation." BNYPL (3/70), 153-65. (Note: This was a publication of her master’s essay, written in 1962 while an MA candidate at Columbia U.)

"William Blake, The Pars Brothers, and James Basire." N & Q, NS 17 (8/70), 313-14.

“A New Way of Looking at Wallace Stevens’s ‘Thirteen Ways,’” The Explicator 62, no. 4 (Summer 2004), 217-221.

=== Photography ===
_{(in addition to the Galleries on the websites above)}

Out My Window, one-person show at 380 Gallery, NYC, 12/81.

Greenwich Village Side Streets, one-person show at 380 Gallery, NYC, 12/82

The World’s a Stage, one-person show of dress rehearsal of Kegiyo Detained, a play directed by Kazuki Takase at La Mama, at the Morgenthau-Fredricks Gallery, NYC, 4/04-6/04. These photos are now on permanent display at the Sloan-Kettering Medical Center in NYC.

Fleischmanns Street Fair, photos by Bogen of a street fair in a small village in upstate New York, and a recording sponsored by her of one of a number of Schubert lieder arranged for vocal quartet.

Hoggestown Medieval Faire, photos taken by Bogen at the Hoggestown Medieval Faire in Gainesville, Fl in 2009 and 2010 combined with a recording of two Schubert lieder arranged for vocal quartet. The performance and recording were sponsored by The Lark Ascending.

=== Performance Pieces (1997-date) ===
Twelve-Tone Blues

A dramatic monologue adapted from Bogen's short story “Maestro Johann Bubenik” was performed on 10/18/05 by Viola Harris with assists from violist Louise Schulman as part of The Lark Ascending event It Takes Two and again with illustrations based on originals by Salvatore Tagliarino on 10/17/06 at the Austrian Cultural Forum as part of The Lark Ascending event Etwas Altes, Etwas Neues.

Textur

A slide choreography with Bogen’s original digitized images based on her photos and synchronized by her with music by Austrian composer Katharina Klement. This was performed live on 4/9/08 and 4/17/08 as part of The Lark Ascending program Löwenherzen and is currently on Vimeo and videoart.net.

Kassandra, a Reverie

An illustrated reading of Hart Crane’s “Proem: To Brooklyn Bridge” and of the musical work The Cries of Cassandra by Romanian composer Dinu Ghezzo. Performed in 1998 at the Black Box Theater, NYU, and is currently on vimeo and videoart.net.

Black on Black /13

An illustrated reading of Wallace Stevens’s “Thirteen Ways of Looking at a Blackbird” by Brent Bouldin and a performance of Chorale Variations by American composer Richard Brooks. Originally performed as part of The Lark Ascending program American Dream / American Nightmare on 11/11/01, this is currently on Vimeo and videoart.net.

A Noiseless, Patient Spider

A reading of Walt Whitman’s poem by Russell Oberlin with Blackie the Blackbird as the Spider providing a humorous demonstration of the poem's message, and a performance of Schubert’s Die Forelle specially arranged for vocal quartet from The Lark Ascending performance of Schubert Mal Vier at the Austrian Cultural Forum and German Consulate on 4/5/06 and 4/21/06. This was created as an original web show in 2011 and can be found on Vimeo and videoart.net.

Going...gone

An illustrated reading of Austin Dobson’s “For a Copy of Theocritus,” read by Alfred Hyslop, and a performance of The Poems to Come by American composer John Bilotta. This was created in 2011 as an original web show and can be found on Vimeo and videoart.net.

Against the Cold

Illustrated readings of H.D.’s “Sea Iris” and “Sea Rose” by Alice Spivak and a slide choreography of Transpian by American composer Joseph Pehrson, featuring dancer Linda Pehrson. This was created in 2011 as an original web show and can be found on Vimeo and videoart.net.

Coeur de Lion, Mon Coeur

A dramatic monologue about the love story of Richard Lionheart and the trouvère Blondel de Nesle. Performed on 11/12/00 and 4/29/01 as part of The Lark Ascending events Chansons and Lieder I and Chansons and Lieder II; performed again by George McGrath with live music on 2/2/04 and 11/4/04 as part of The Lark Ascending’s programs A Kingdom for a Song, Vienna Vidi Vici, and Löwenherzen (Lion Hearts) at the Austrian Cultural Forum. An earlier version is now in the Gallery of The Lark Ascending.

Verlaine Variations

A slide choreography of a chanson with music by American composer Elodie Lauten. This is a new, far more sophisticated version of a slide choreography that Bogen created in November of 2000. The work was premiered as part of Chanson and Lieder I by The Lark Ascending, and performed again on April 29, 2001 as part of Chanson and Lieder II. The earlier version can be found in the Gallery of thelarkascending.org. The current version can be found on Vimeo.

My Country ‘Tis

An illustrated reading of Archibald MacLeish’s poem"Men" followed by a slide choreography of My Country 'Tis of Thee with music by American composer Harold Seletsky. The story told via the music is of the burning of Kingston, NY by the British and various allies and henchmen during the American Revolution. It can be found on Vimeo.

Licorice Moments

An illustrated reading of François Villon’s celebrated poem, "Ballade Des Dames Du Temps Jadis," and a slide choreography of Clusters with music by American composer Hubert Howe. It can be found on Vimeo.

Mein Lebenslauf

An illustrated autobiographical cantata with music by Georg Schönberg (1906-74), Austrian-born oldest son of renowned composer Arnold Schönberg and his first wife, Mathilde von Zemlinsky. A mature Georg is narrator; four guardian angels comment. It can be found on Vimeo.

Zounds, Towns!

A slide choreography of E. E. Cummings’s “anyone lived in a pretty how town” followed by “Dialogues for Flute and Tape” by Leo Kraft. The illustrations to the one became the artifacts of the other. It can be found on Vimeo.

Hello, Goodbye

A slide choreography of Emily Dickinson’s “#348" (“I dreaded that first robin so”) followed by Richard Brooks’s TRIO for violin, violoncello, and piano. The illustrations to the one became the artifacts of the other. It can be found on Vimeo.

Finnegan's Shake

There is a thread of sense running through this, honestly: a progressive slide-choreography, featuring my poem “Soldiers: or Thermopylae Revisited,” composer Trent Hanna’s SAMARA, and the final lines of T. S. Eliot’s “Love Song of J. Alfred Prufrock.” It can be found on Vimeo.

Dee Blue Konditorei

Schubert’s lied LITANEI (“for All-Souls Eve”), Rilke’s poem “DAS DORF” (“The Town”) and American composer Judith Shatin’s HOSECH AL P'NEY HA TEHOM (“Darkness Upon the Face of the Deep”) are the ingredients of this work. It can be found on Vimeo.

Ars Gratia Artis

A slide choreography of Archibald MacLeish’s “Ars Poetica” followed by the third movement of Arnold Rosner’s String Quartet #4. Both poem and music represent pure beauty, pure art; the illustrations to the one became the artifacts of the other. It can be found on Vimeo.

Rosebud, an Elegy

Rosebud = the name of the dear childhood sled that rich man Citizen Kane cherished. Elegy = a poetic work consisting of disparate ideational elements that create a unity of their own. In order of appearance: a slide choreography of the famous opening lines of Walther von der Vogelweide’s DER REICHSTON (“Ich saz ûf eime steine”–“ I sat upon a stone”), of Franz Schubert’s AN DIE MUSIK, of the “Yellow Fog”-stanza of T.S. Eliot’s “Love Song of J. Alfred Prufrock,” and of composer Jon Nelson’s TURBULENT BLUE. It can be found on Vimeo.

Lilacs in the Dooryard

Walt Whitman’s WHEN LILACS LAST IN THE DOORYARD BLOOM’D read by Russell Oberlin, with the “Song of the Hermit Thrush” sung in sprechgesang fashion by Shirley Perkins. It can be found on Vimeo.

Wien Wein Wien

A quick travel-tour thru Vienna accompanied by Wien, Wien Nur Du Allein as rendered, a capella, by my husband Arnold Greissle-Schoenberg, followed by a slide choreography of the very fetching 48 13 N, 16 20 O by Korean composer Tae Hong Park. It can be found on Vimeo.

Sunday Inharmonic

An illustrated reading of Wallace Stevens's “Sunday Morning” by Russell Oberlin and a slide choreography of Hubert Howe’s INHARMONIC FANTASY #3. The images of the one become the artifacts of the other. It can be found on Vimeo.

=== Websites ===
www.thelarkascending.org —

The Lark Ascending, the not-for-profit performance group that Bogen headed from 1997 to 2008.

www.schoenbergseuropeanfamily.org —

The site is a subsidiary of The Lark Ascending, the not-for-profit performance group headed by Bogen, and it is cross-linked with the site of the Arnold Schoenberg Center in Vienna and the Alexander Zemlinsky site. Included on it are finished translations of Arnold Greissle-Schönberg’s memoirs Arnold Schönberg und Sein Wiener Kreis (Vienna: Bohlau, 1995), which Bogen revised and edited from a rough translation by him and provided with photo links of archival materials digitized by her. Also included on the site is a gallery of photos taken by Bogen of the author's hometown Mödling and the Schönberg House there, and of Traunkirchen and the Villa Spaun, and the eastern shore of the Traunsee, which figure in chapter two.
