= Gustavus Katterfelto =

Prussian conjurer (died 1799)

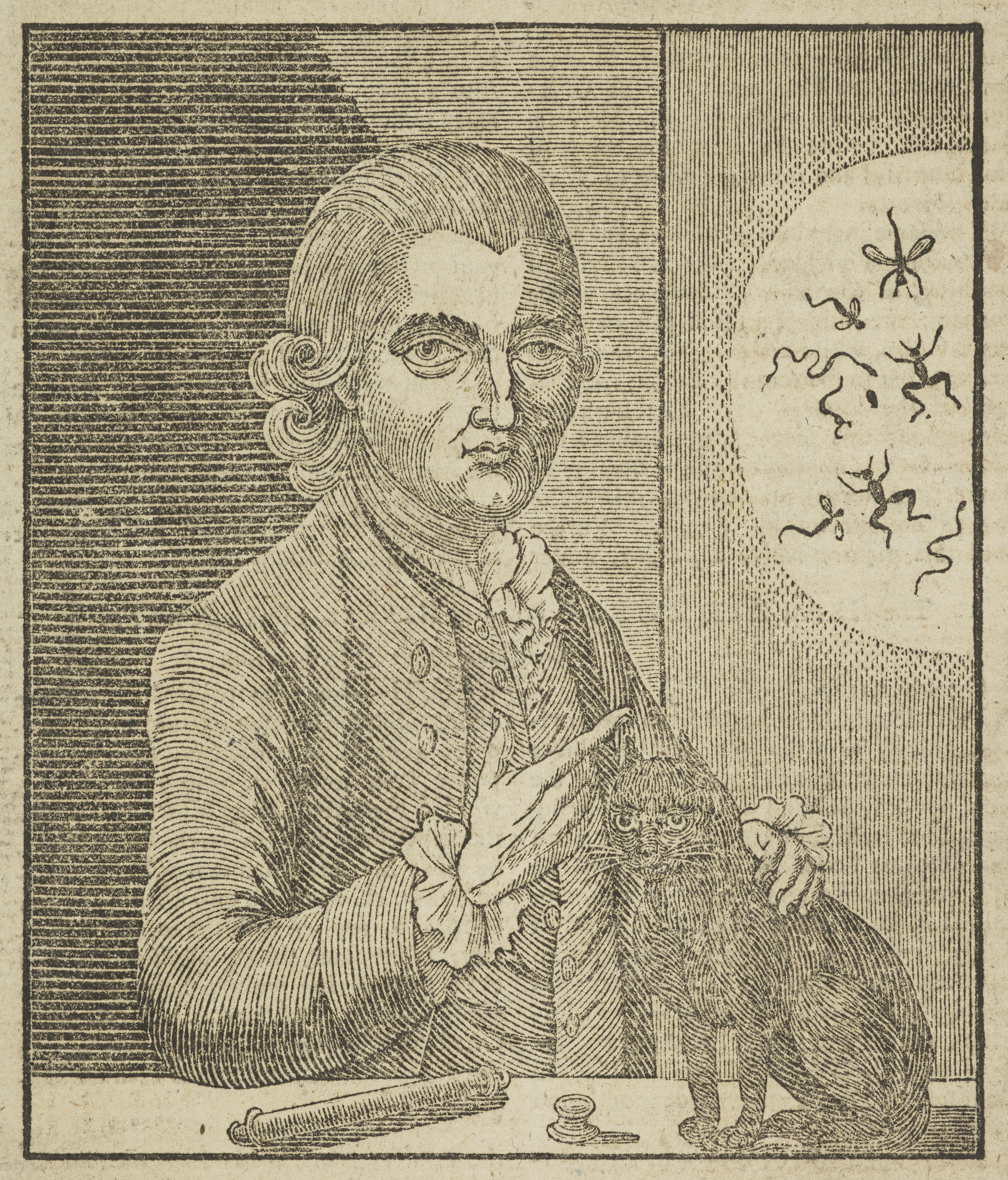
Gustavus Katterfelto

Gustavus Katterfelto (or Katerfelto) (c. 1743–15 November 1799) was a Prussian conjurer, scientific lecturer, and quack who travelled through Georgian England.

== Career ==
Christian William Anthony Katterfelto (known as Gustavus) arrived at Hull in September 1776 along with his wife, daughter, and a black kitten. He advertised in the local newspapers:

On the 26th of September - arrived at Hull where he has ever since performed in the Concert-Room with universal Applause, a Son of Col. Katterfelto of the famous Prussian Regiment of Death-Head Hussars, Professor of Natural Philosophy, Mathematics, Astronomy, Geography, Fortification, Navigation etc. For 15 years past he has travelled thro’most Parts of Europe, and spent a considerable Fortune, purposely to improve himself in Philosophy and Mathematics, and has finished a curious Apparatus for his own Amusement, and for the Instruction of the Public. – He will exhibit in Nicholson's Great Room, Coney-Street York, Tomorrow Evening (Oct. 9) and every Evening this Week. The Doors will be opened at Six, and the Performance to begin at Seven. Admittance to the three front Seats 2s each, back Seats 1s only. – His various astonishing Performances are fully expressed in Hand-Bills which will be delivered this Day. He goes from this City to Leeds, Wakefield, Halifax etc.

He traveled around Britain until his death in 1799. He performed in London from 1780 to 1784. He was arrested on occasion ("as a rogue and vagabond" at Kendal) for breaking local laws. The widespread flu epidemic of 1782 made him famous as a quack, when he used a solar microscope to show images of microbes he believed were its cause. These "insects" provided him with the catchphrase "Wonders! Wonders! Wonders!" which often headed his advertisements. He lectured in Piccadilly on electricity, magnetism and the invented terms "styangraphy, palenchics, and caprimantic arts" to impress his audience. After allegedly suffering from a bout of flu, he began to promote Dr Batto's medicine which he claimed had cured him in 12 hours. He sided with the contagion theory of disease that had been proposed by some Arab physicians although he called the causal organisms "insects", claiming that vast numbers of them could be found in a drop of water.

Katterfelto was an accomplished conjurer, who performed with a black cat which he advertised as "evil". He claimed to have launched the first hot air balloon fifteen years before the Montgolfier brothers, and claimed to be the greatest natural philosopher since Isaac Newton.

He performed on several occasions for the royal family. The poet William Cowper refers to Katterfelto in The Task. For a while the word "Katerfelto" became synonymous with charlatan.

Katterfelto died in 1799 in Bedale, North Yorkshire where he is buried.
