= John Flaxman =

English sculptor and draughtsman (1755–1826)

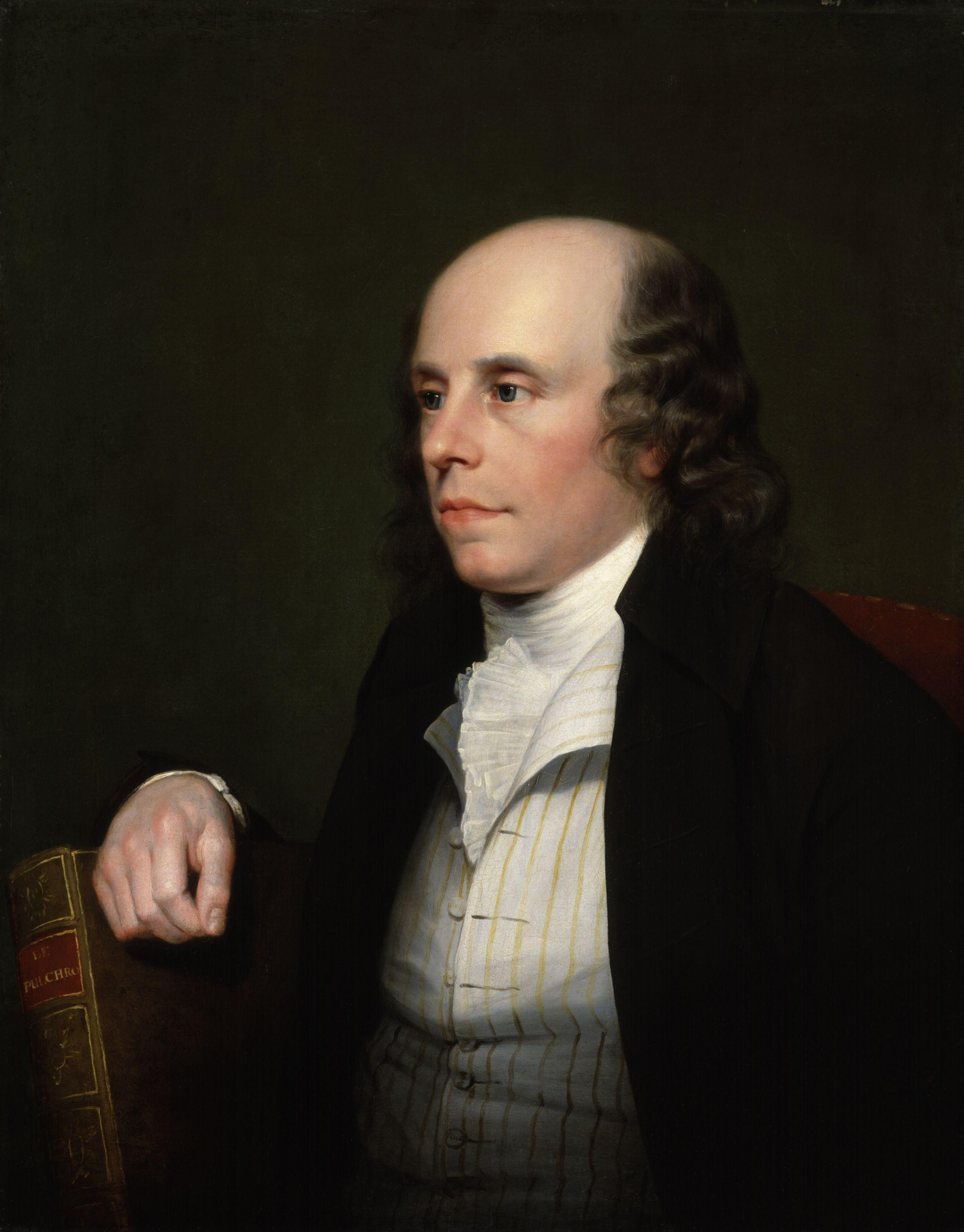
- 1792 portrait of Flaxman by Guy Head
- Born: 6 July 1755; York, England
- Died: 7 December 1826 (aged 71); London, England
- Known for: Sculpture and engraving
- Movement: Neoclassicism
- Spouse: Anne ("Nancy") Denman (m. 1782; died 1820)

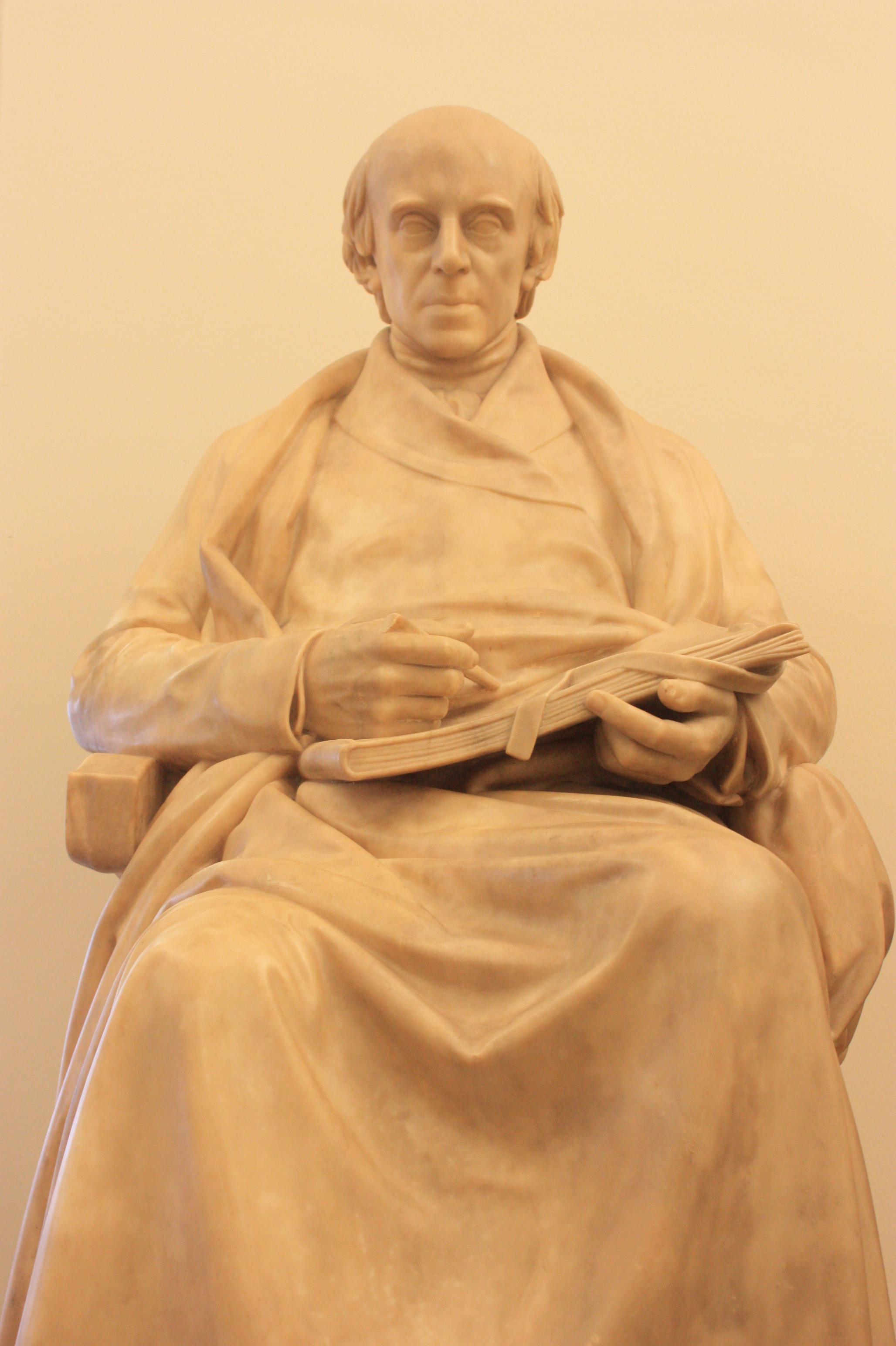
John Flaxman by Musgrave Watson, University College London, 1847

John Flaxman RA (6 July 1755 – 7 December 1826) was an English sculptor and draughtsman who was a leading figure in British and European Neoclassicism. Early in his career, he worked as a modeller for Josiah Wedgwood's pottery. He spent several years in Rome, where he produced his first book illustrations. He was a prolific maker of funerary monuments.

== Early life and education ==
He was born in York. His father, also named John (1726–1803), was well known as a moulder and seller of plaster casts at the sign of the Golden Head, New Street, Covent Garden, London. His first wife's maiden name was Lee, and they had two sons, William and John.

Within six months of John's birth, the family returned to London. He was a sickly child, high-shouldered, with a head too large for his body. His mother died when he was nine, and his father married Elisabeth Gordon in 1763. John had little schooling and was largely self-educated. He took delight in drawing and modelling from his father's stock-in-trade, and studied translations from classical literature in an effort to understand them.

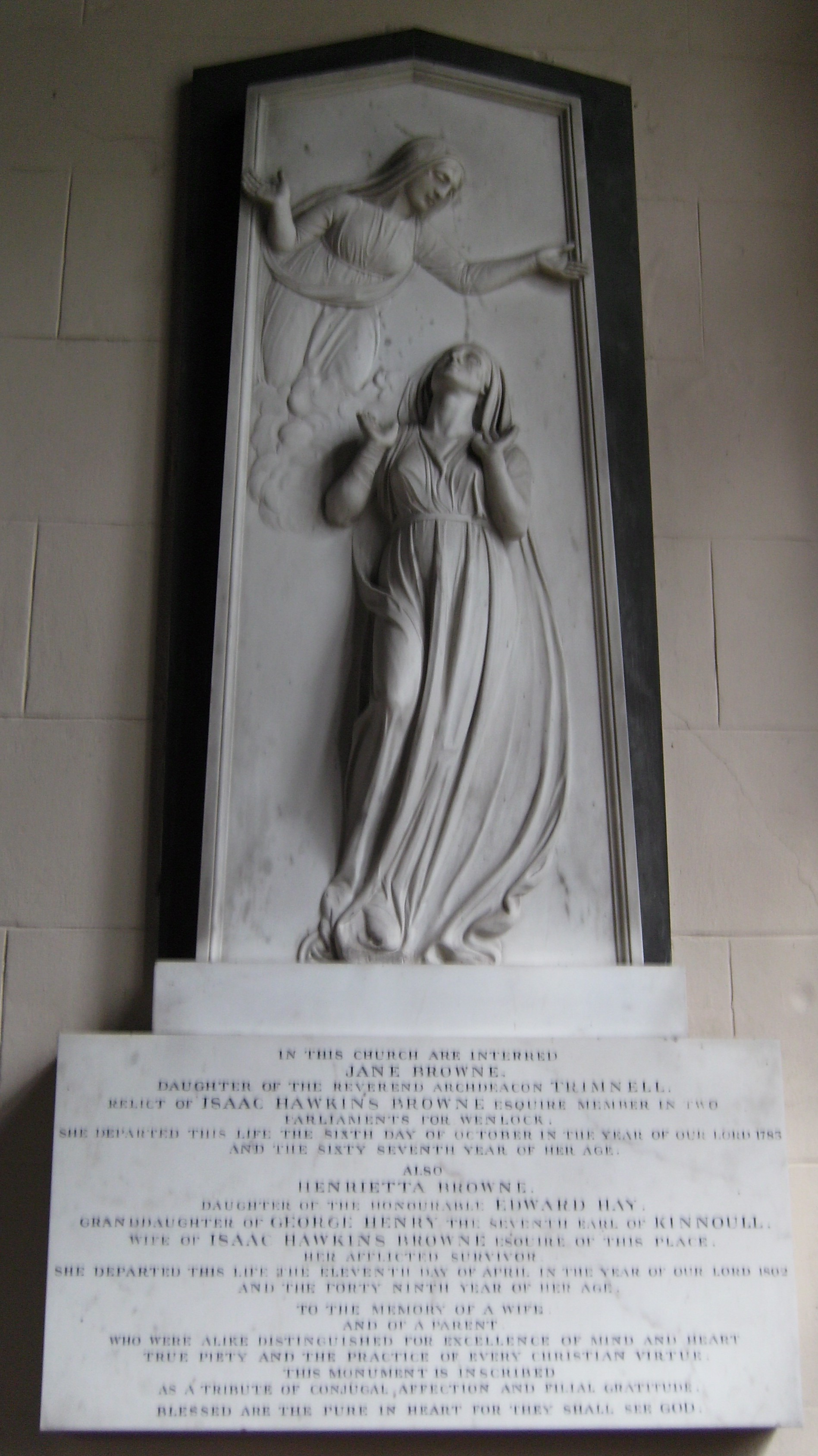
Memorial in the church at Badger, Shropshire

His father's customers helped him with books, advice, and later with commissions. Particularly significant were the painter George Romney, and a cultivated clergyman, Anthony Stephen Mathew and his wife Mrs. Mathew, in whose house in Rathbone Place the young Flaxman used to meet the best "blue-stocking" society of the day and, among those his own age, the artists William Blake and Thomas Stothard, who became his closest friends. At the age of 12 he won the first prize of the Society of Arts for a medallion, and exhibited in the gallery of the Free Society of Artists; at 15 he won a second prize from the Society of Arts and showed at the Royal Academy for the first time. In the same year, 1770, he entered the academy as a student and won the silver medal. In the competition for the gold medal of the academy in 1772, however, Flaxman was defeated, the prize being awarded by the president, Sir Joshua Reynolds, to a competitor, George Engleheart. This episode seemed to help cure Flaxman of a tendency to conceit which led Thomas Wedgwood V to say of him in 1775, "It is but a few years since he was a most supreme coxcomb."

He continued to work diligently, both as a student and as an exhibitor at the academy, with occasional attempts at painting. To the academy he contributed a wax model of Neptune (1770); four portrait models in wax (1771); a terracotta bust, a wax figure of a child, a historical figure (1772); a figure of Comedy; and a relief of a Vestal (1773). During this period he received a commission from a friend of the Mathew family for a statue of Alexander the Great, but he was unable to obtain a regular income from private contracts.

== Wedgwood ==
From 1775 he was employed by the potter Josiah Wedgwood and his partner Thomas Bentley, for whom his father had also done some work, modelling reliefs for use on the company's jasperware and basaltware. The usual procedure was to model the reliefs in wax on slate or glass grounds before they cast for production. Pierre-François Hugues d'Hancarville's engravings of Sir William Hamilton's collection of ancient Greek vases were an important influence on his work.

His designs included the Apotheosis of Homer (1778), later used for a vase; Hercules in the Garden of Hesperides (1785); a large range of small bas-reliefs of which The Dancing Hours (1776–8) proved especially popular; library busts, portrait medallions, and a chess set.

== Early sculptural work ==
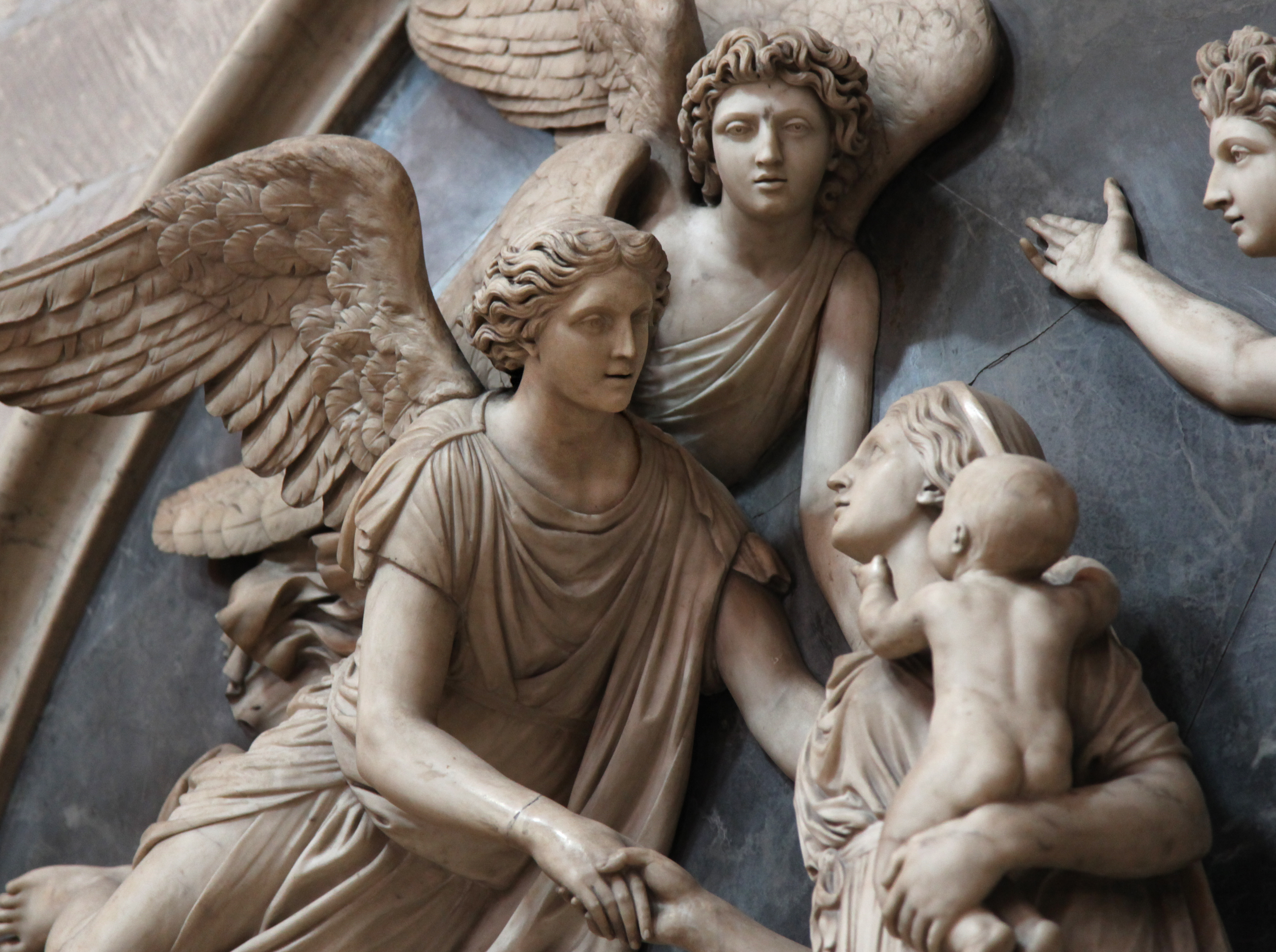
Detail of monument to Sarah Morley in Gloucester Cathedral

By 1780 Flaxman had also begun to earn money by sculpting grave monuments. His early memorials included those to Thomas Chatterton in the church of St Mary Redcliffe in Bristol (1780), Mrs Morley in Gloucester Cathedral (1784), and the Rev. Thomas and Mrs Margaret Ball in Chichester Cathedral (1785). During the rest of Flaxman's career memorial bas-reliefs of this type made up the bulk of his output, and are to be found in many churches throughout England. One example, the monument to George Steevens, originally in St Matthias Old Church, is now in the Fitzwilliam Museum, Cambridge. His best monumental work was admired for its pathos and simplicity, and for the combination of a truly Greek instinct for rhythmical design and composition with a spirit of domestic tenderness and innocence.

== Marriage ==
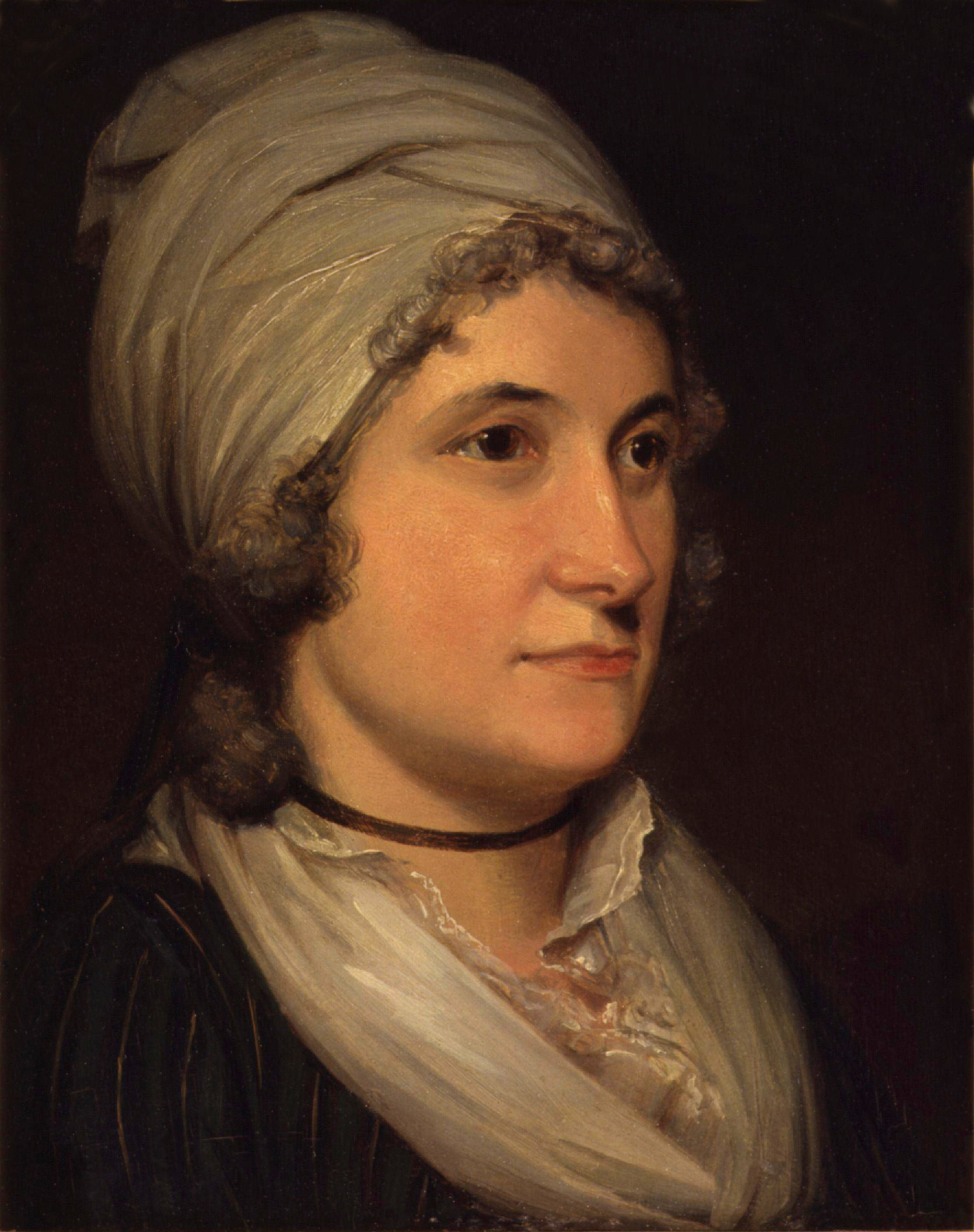
Anne, Flaxman's wife, by Henry Howard, c. 1797

In 1782, aged 27, Flaxman married Anne ("Nancy") Denman, who was to assist him throughout his career. She was well-educated, and a devoted companion. The match faced initial objections from Nancy's father, which were eventually surmounted with help from Harriet Mathew. Flaxman expressed his gratitude towards the Mathews by painting their library with "figures in niches, in the Gothic manner."

John and Nancy Flaxman set up house in Wardour Street, and usually spent their summer holidays as guests of the poet William Hayley, at Eartham in Sussex. Flaxman took a shine to the Denman family, particularly Nancy's younger sister Maria, whom he trained as a sculptor, and to whom he left a great deal in his will. He also employed Nancy's brother Thomas Denman in his studio and it was Denman who completed the various unfinished sculptures in Flaxman's studio after his death. Flaxman's portrait of Maria is held in the Soane Museum.

== Italy ==
In 1787, five years after their marriage, Flaxman and his wife set off for Rome, on a journey partly funded by Wedgwood. His activities in the city included supervising a group of modellers employed by Wedgwood, although he no longer made any work for the potter himself. His sketchbooks show that while there he studied not only Classical, but also Medieval and Renaissance art.

While in Rome he produced the first of the book illustrations for which he was to become famous, and which promoted his influence all over Europe, leading Goethe to describe him as "the idol of all dilettanti". His designs for the works of Homer (published in 1793) were commissioned by Georgiana Hare-Naylor; those for Dante (first published in London in 1807) by Thomas Hope; those for Aeschylus by Georgiana Spencer, Countess Spencer. All were engraved by Piroli. Flaxman created one hundred and eleven illustrations to Dante's Divine Comedy which served as an inspiration for such artists as Goya and Ingres, and were used as an academic source for 19th-century art students.

He had originally intended to stay in Italy for little more than two years, but was detained by a commission for a marble group of the Fury of Athamas for Frederick Hervey, 4th Earl of Bristol and Bishop of Derry, which proved troublesome. By the time of his return to England in the summer of 1794, after an absence of seven years, he had also executed Cephalus and Aurora, a group in marble based on a story in Ovid's Metamorphoses. This was bought by Thomas Hope, who arrived in Rome in 1791, and is often said to have commissioned it. Hope was later to make it the centrepiece of a "Flaxman room" at his London home. It is now in the collection of the Lady Lever Art Gallery, Liverpool.

== Return to England ==
During their homeward journey, the Flaxmans travelled through central and northern Italy. On their return they took a house in Buckingham Street, Fitzroy Square, which they never left. Buckingham Street has since been renamed Greenwell Street, W1; there is a plaque to Flaxman on the front wall of no.7 identifying this as the site of the house where Flaxman lived. Immediately after his return the sculptor published a protest against the scheme (already considered by the French Directory and carried out two years later by Napoleon) to set up a vast central museum of art at Paris to contain works looted from across Europe. Despite this, he later took take advantage of the Peace of Amiens to go to Paris to see the despoiled treasures collected there.

While still in Rome, Flaxman had sent home models for several sepulchral monuments, including one in relief for the poet William Collins in Chichester Cathedral, and one in the round for Lord Mansfield in Westminster Abbey.

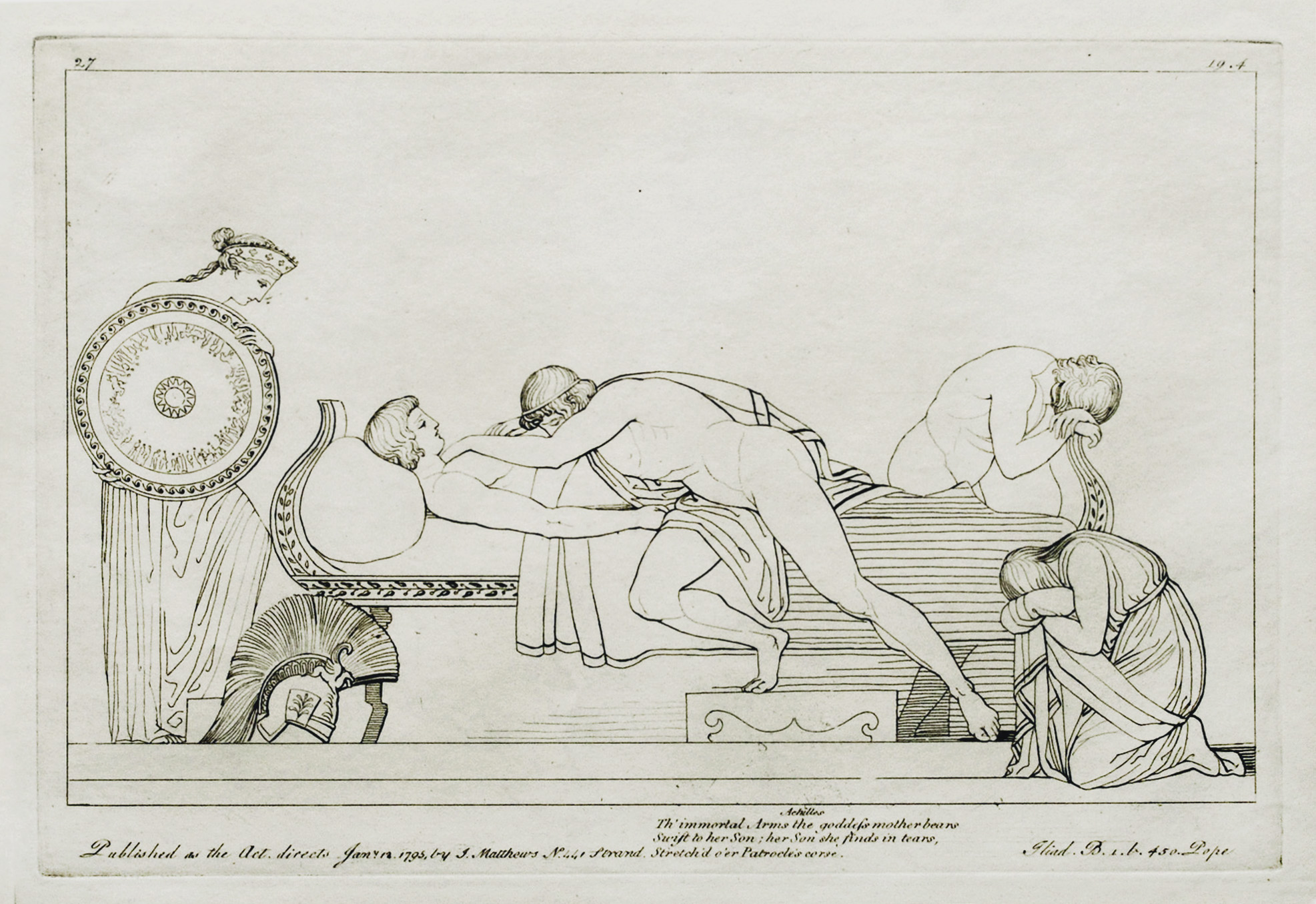
A 1795 engraving after Flaxman's drawing of Achilles mourning Patrocles

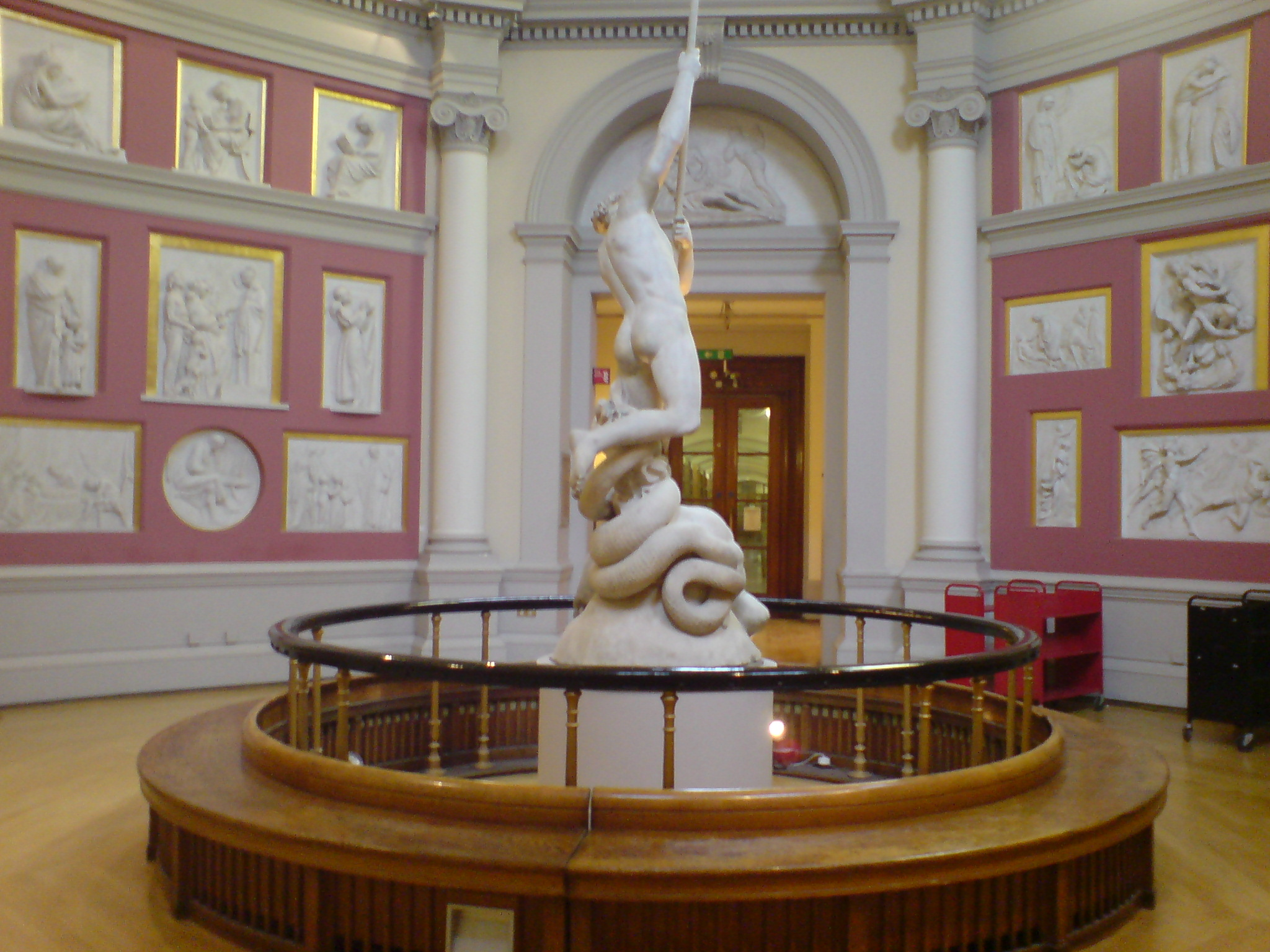
The Flaxman Gallery of UCL main library in the Octagon building

In 1797 he was made an associate of the Royal Academy. He exhibited work at the academy annually, occasionally showing a public monument in the round, like those of Pasquale Paoli (1798) or Captain Montague (1802) for Westminster Abbey, of Sir William Jones for University College, Oxford (1797–1801), of Nelson or Howe for St Paul's Cathedral, but more often memorials for churches, with symbolic Acts of Mercy or illustrations of biblical texts, usually in low relief. He made a large number of these smaller funerary monuments; his work was in great demand, and he did not charge particularly high prices. Occasionally he would vary his output with a classical piece like those he favoured in his earlier years. Soon after his election as Associate of the academy, he published a scheme for a grandiose monument to be erected on Greenwich Hill, in the form of a figure of Britannia 230 ft (70 m) high, in honour of British naval victories.

== Later life ==
In 1800 he was elected a full Academician, and in 1810 the academy appointed him to the specially created post of Professor of Sculpture. He was a thorough and judicious teacher, and his lectures were often reprinted. According to Sidney Colvin writing in the Encyclopædia Britannica Eleventh Edition: "With many excellent observations, and with one singular merit—that of doing justice, as in those days justice was hardly ever done, to the sculpture of the medieval schools—these lectures lack point and felicity of expression, just as they are reported to have lacked fire in delivery, and are somewhat heavy reading." His most important sculptural works from the years following this appointment were the monument to Mrs Baring in Micheldever church, the richest of all his monuments in relief (1805–1811); that for the Cooke-Yarborough family at Campsall church, Yorkshire, those to Sir Joshua Reynolds for St Paul's (1807); to Captain Webbe for India (1810); to Captains Walker and Beckett for Leeds (1811); to Lord Cornwallis for Prince of Wales's Island (1812); and to Sir John Moore for Glasgow (1813).

He was commissioned to create the monument to Matthew Boulton (died 1809), by Boulton's son, which is on the north wall of the sanctuary of St Mary's Church, Handsworth, Birmingham, where Boulton is buried. It includes a marble bust of Boulton, set in a circular opening above two putti, one holding an engraving of the Soho Manufactory.

Around this time there was much debate over the merits of the sculptures from the Parthenon in Athens, which had been brought to Britain by Lord Elgin, and were hence popularly known as the Elgin Marbles. When Flaxman first saw them at Elgin's house in 1807, he advised against their restoration. Flaxman's statements in favour of their purchase by the government to a parliamentary commission carried considerable weight; the sculptures were eventually bought in 1816. His designs for the friezes of Ancient Drama and Modern Drama, for the façade of the Theatre Royal, Covent Garden, made in 1809 and carved by John Charles Felix Rossi, provide an early example of the direct influence of the marbles on British sculpture.

In the years immediately following his Roman period he produced fewer outline designs for publication, except three for William Cowper's translations of the Latin poems of John Milton (1810). In 1817, however, he returned to the genre, publishing a set of designs to Hesiod, which were engraved by Blake. He also designed work for goldsmiths at around this time—a testimonial cup in honour of John Kemble, and the famous and beautiful (though quite un-Homeric) "Shield of Achilles" designed between 1810 and 1817 for Rundell, Bridge and Rundell. Other late works included a frieze of Peace, Liberty and Plenty, for John Russell, 6th Duke of Bedford's sculpture gallery at Woburn Abbey, and a heroic group of St Michael overthrowing Satan, for George Wyndham, 3rd Earl of Egremont's Petworth House, delivered after Flaxman's death. He also wrote several articles on art and archaeology for Rees's Cyclopædia (1819–20).

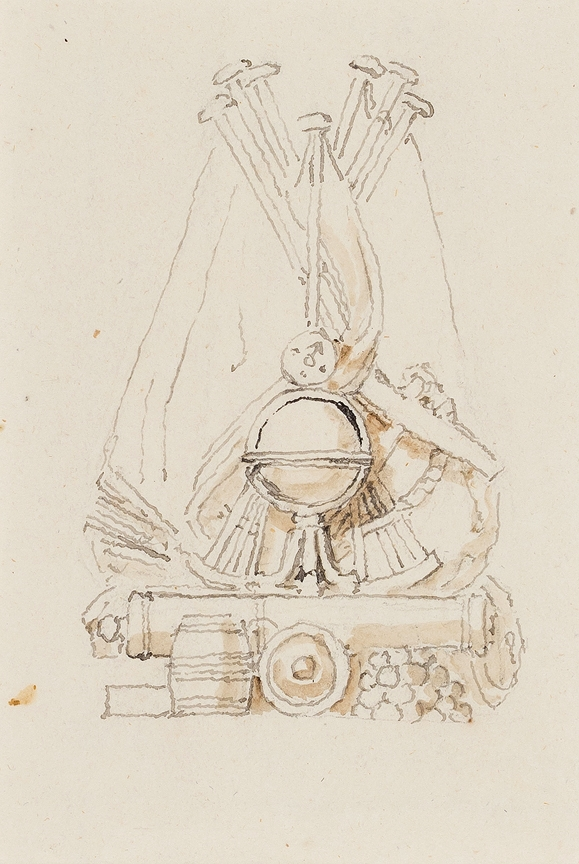
Design for the façade decoration of Buckingham Palace (1821–1826)

In the last six years of his life, Flaxman designed decorations for the façades of Buckingham Palace. Some of his drawings for this commission are now held by the Royal Collection Trust.

In 1819 his Statue of Sir John Moore was erected in George Square, Glasgow. In 1820 Flaxman's wife died. Her younger sister, Maria Denman, and his half sister, Mary Ann Flaxman, continued to live with him, and he continued to work hard. In 1822 he delivered at the academy a lecture in memory of his old friend, Canova, who had recently died; in 1823 he received a visit from Schlegel, who wrote an account of their meeting.

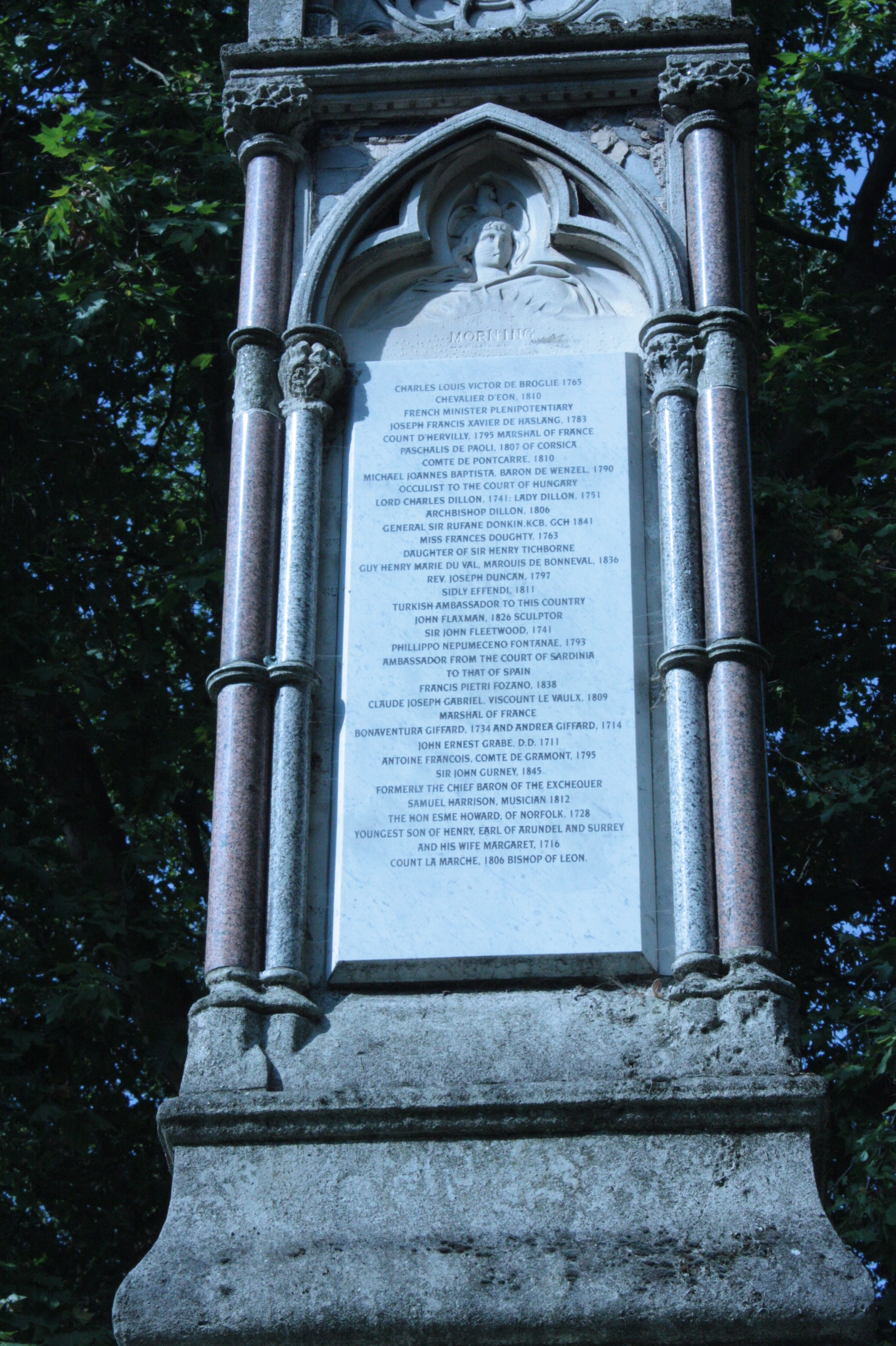
Flaxman's name listed on the south face of the Burdett Coutts memorial

Flaxman died, aged 71, on 7 December 1826. His name is listed as one of the important lost graves on the Burdett Coutts Memorial in Old St. Pancras Churchyard. He was buried at St. Giles' Cemetery, King's Road (St Giles in the Fields), beside his wife Anne and his sister Mary Ann Flaxman. There is also a monument to him in St Giles in the Fields in the north lobby.

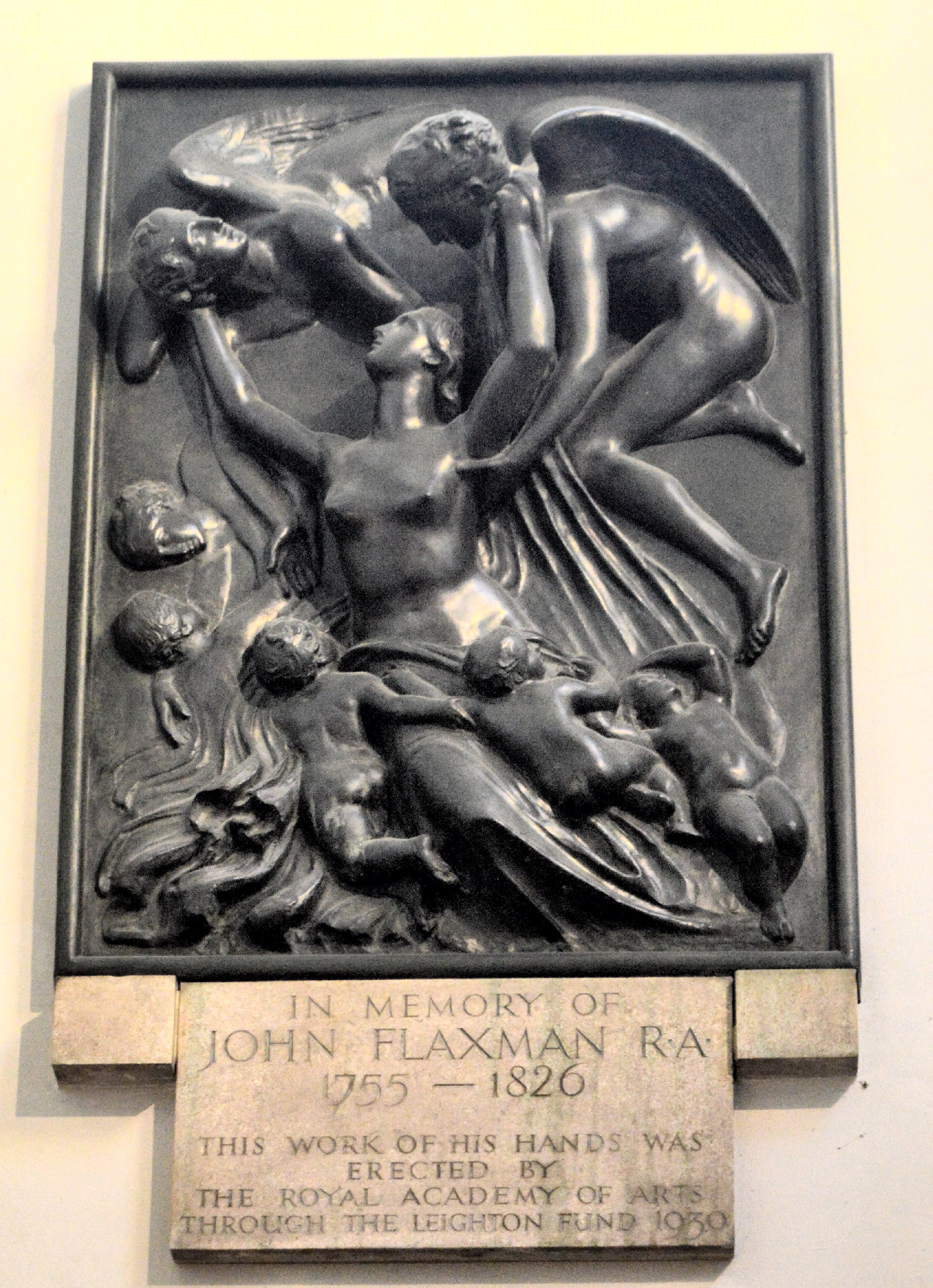
St Giles in the Fields, John Flaxman RA monument

Flaxman Terrace in Bloomsbury, London, is named after him. The Chelsea telephone exchange that became 020 7352 was also named after him, the digits 352 still corresponding to the old three-letter dialling code FLA.

== Studio practice ==
Most of the carving of his works was carried out by assistants; Margaret Whinney thought that, as a result, "the execution of some of his marbles is a little dull" but that "his plaster models, cast from his own designs in clay, frequently show more sensitive handling". Early in his career, Flaxman made his works in the form of small models which his assistants would scale up when making the finished marble versions. In many cases, notably with the monument to Lord Howe, this proved problematic, and for his later works, he produced full-sized plaster versions for his employees to work from.

== Critical reception ==
Flaxman's complicated monuments in the round, such as the three in Westminster Abbey and the four in St Paul's Cathedral, are considered too "heavy"; but his simple monuments in relief are of finer quality. He thoroughly understood relief, and it gave better scope for his particular talents. His compositions are best studied in the casts from his studio sketches, of which a comprehensive collection is preserved in the Flaxman gallery at University College, London.

== Collections of Flaxman's work ==
The principal public collections of Flaxman's work are at University College London, in the British Museum, and the Victoria and Albert Museum. University College London also holds archival material belonging to Flaxman and a collection of books illustrated by him.

== Sources ==
- Whinney, Margaret (1971). English Sculpture 1720–1830. Victoria and Albert Museum Monographs. London: Her Majesty's Stationery Office.
- This includes a detailed assessment by Colvin of the artist's work.
