= Holy Thursday (Songs of Innocence) =

Poem by William Blake

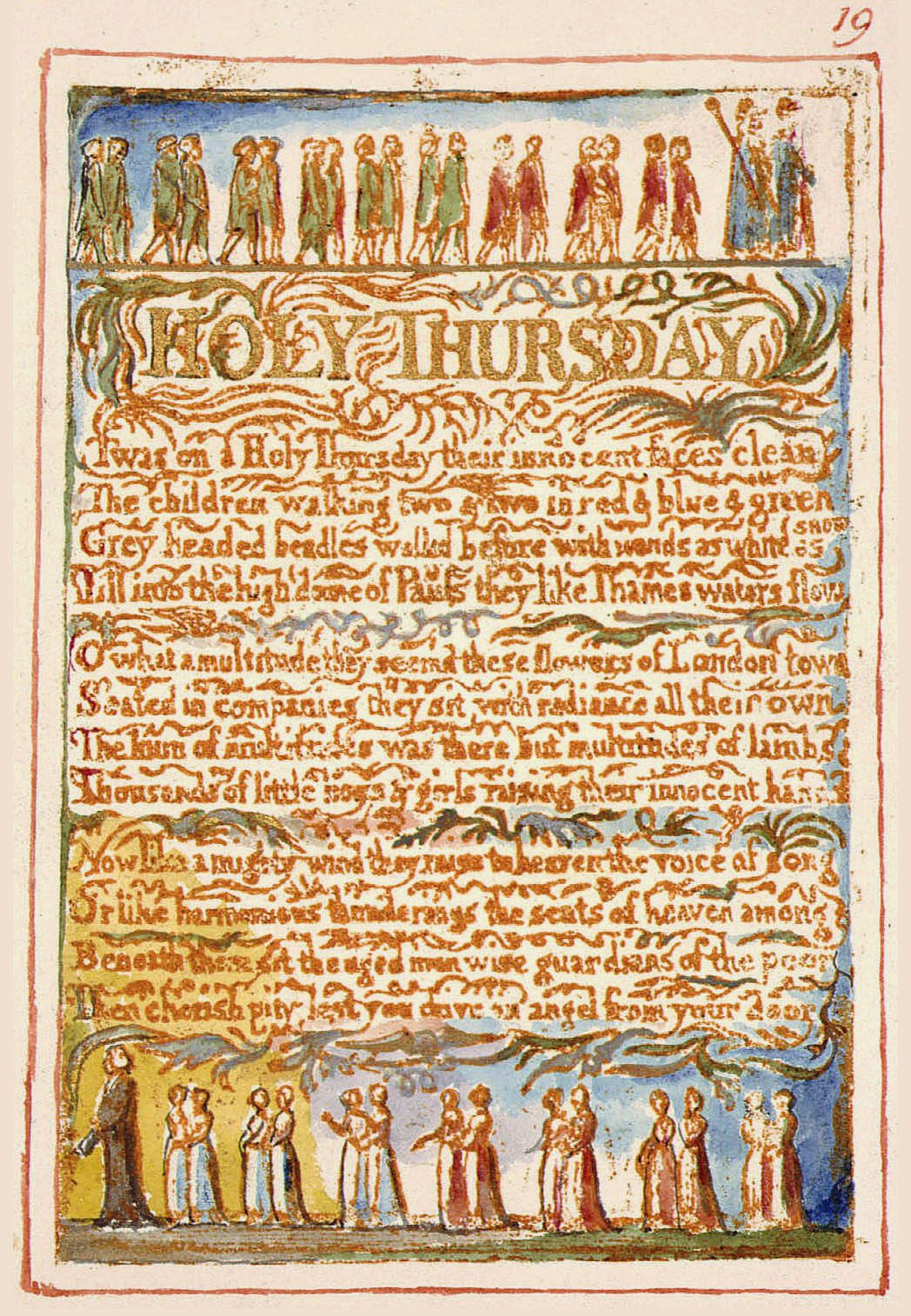
Copy AA of "Holy Thursday", printed in 1826. This copy is currently held by the Fitzwilliam Museum in Cambridge.

"Holy Thursday" is a poem by William Blake, from his 1789 book of poems Songs of Innocence. (There is also a Holy Thursday poem in Songs of Experience, which contrasts with this song.)

The poem depicts a ceremony held on Ascension Day, which in England was then called Holy Thursday, a name now generally applied to what is also called Maundy Thursday: Six thousand orphans of London's charity schools, scrubbed clean and dressed in the coats of distinctive colours, are marched two by two to St Paul's Cathedral, under the control of their beadles, and sing in the cathedral.

The children in their colourful dresses are compared to flowers and their procession toward the church as a river. Their singing on the day that commemorated the Ascension of Jesus is depicted as raising them above their old, lifeless guardians, who remain at a lower level.

The bleak reality of the orphans' lives is depicted in the contrasting poem, "Holy Thursday" (Songs of Experience).

== Poem ==
Twas on a Holy Thursday their innocent faces clean
The children walking two & two in red & blue & green
Grey headed beadles walkd before, with wands as white as snow
Till into the high dome of Pauls they like Thames waters flow

O what a multitude they seemd these flowers of London town
Seated in companies they sit with radiance all their own
The hum of multitudes was there but multitudes of lambs
Thousands of little boys & girls raising their innocent hands

Now like a mighty wind they raise to heaven the voice of song
Or like harmonious thunderings the seats of heaven among
Beneath them sit the aged men wise guardians of the poor
Then cherish pity, lest you drive an angel from your door
