= Holy Thursday (Songs of Experience) =

Poem by William Blake

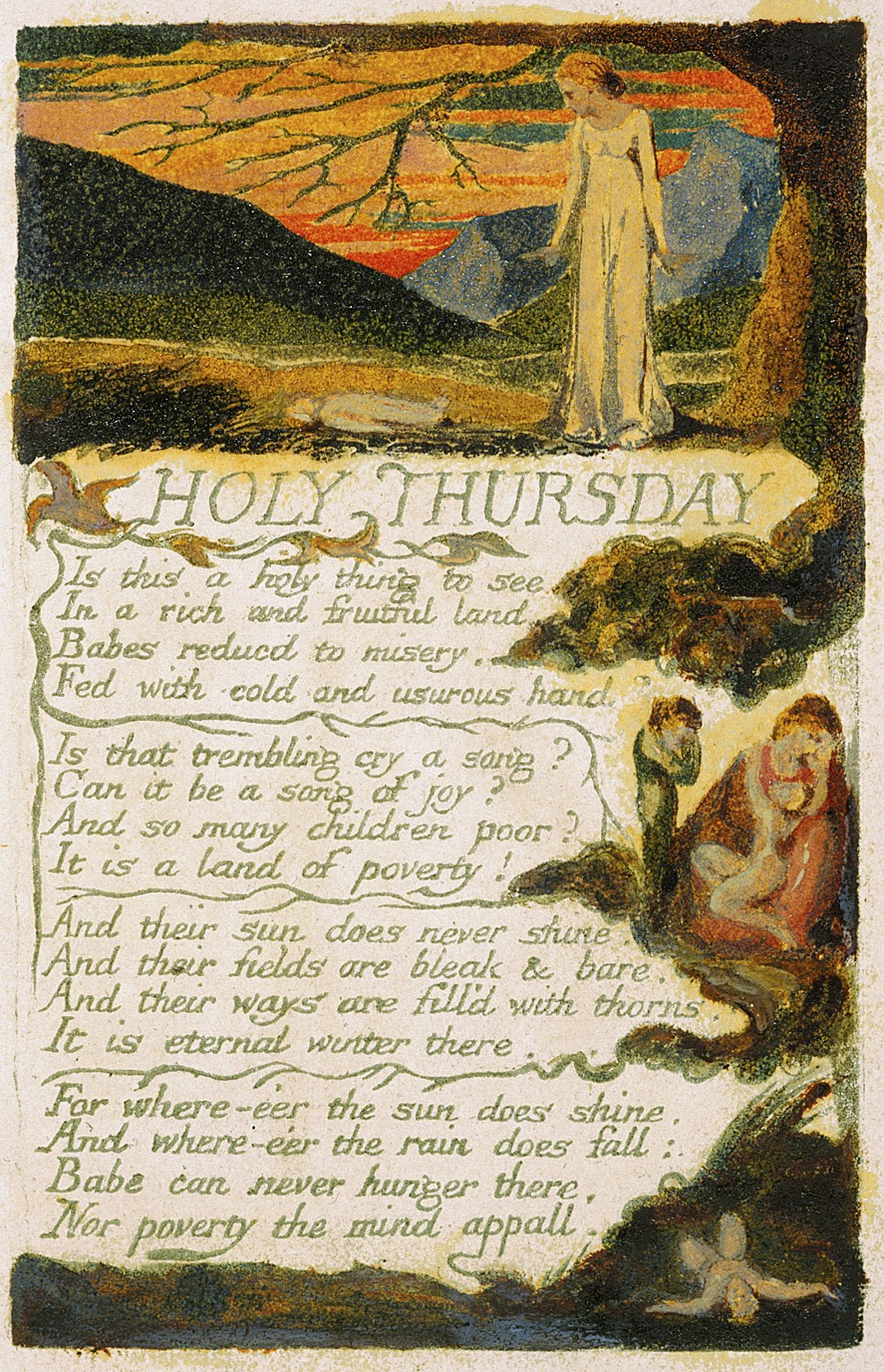
William Blake's 1794 "Holy Thursday".This image depicts copy F of the illustration currently held by the Yale Center for British Art.

"Holy Thursday" is a poem by William Blake, first published in Songs of Innocence and Experience in 1794. This poem, unlike its companion poem in "Songs of Innocence" (1789), focuses more on society as a whole than on the ceremony held in London.

== Analysis ==
The primary objective of this poem is to question social and moral injustice. In the first stanza, Blake contrasts the "rich and fruitful land" with the actions of a "cold and usurous hand" - thereby continuing his questioning of the virtue of a society where resources are abundant but children are still "reduced to misery".

The "Holy Thursday" referred to in the poem is Ascension Thursday, which in the Church of England and other parts of the Anglican Communion, can be used a synonym for the same feast; Thomas Pruen uses the term to refer to Ascension Day in his Illustration of the Liturgy of the Church of England, published in 1820; however use of the term "Holy Thursday" to mean Ascension Day is rare, and the term is more generally applied by most Christian denominations to Maundy Thursday in Holy Week.

On Ascension Day a service was held in St. Paul's Cathedral for the poor children of London's charity schools. Appreciation of the "wise guardians of the poor" thus advertising their charity may not be wholly shared by Blake's "Piper", the supposed narrator of the "Songs of Innocence". In their state of innocence, children should not be regimented; rather, they should be playing blithely on the "echoing green". The children in this poem "assert and preserve their essential innocence not by going to church, but by freely and spontaneously, 'like a mighty wind,' raising to 'heaven the voice of song'".

With his "Holy Thursday" of the "Songs of Experience", Blake's "Bard" clarifies his view of the hypocrisy of formal religion and its claimed acts of charity. He sees the established church's hymns as a sham, suggesting in his second stanza that the sound which would represent the day more accurately would be the "trembling cry" of a poor child.

The poet, as Bard, states that although England may be objectively a "rich and fruitful land", the unfeeling profit-orientated power of authority has designed for the innocent children suffering within it an "eternal winter". The biblical connotations of the rhetorical opening point us towards Blake's assertion that a country whose children live in want cannot be described as truly "rich". With the apparent contradiction of two climatic opposites existing simultaneously within the one geopolitical unit, we are offered a metaphor for England's man-made "two nations".

Blake wrote during the Industrial Revolution, whose pioneers congratulated themselves upon their vigorous increases in output. The poet argues that until increases in production are linked to more equitable distribution, England will always be a land of barren winter.

== Poem ==
Is this a holy thing to see,
In a rich and fruitful land,
Babes reducd to misery,
Fed with cold and usurous hand?

Is that trembling cry a song?
Can it be a song of joy?
And so many children poor?
It is a land of poverty!

And their sun does never shine.
And their fields are bleak & bare.
And their ways are fill'd with thorns.
It is eternal winter there.

For where-e'er the sun does shine,
And where-e'er the rain does fall:
Babe can never hunger there,
Nor poverty the mind appall.
