= There is No Natural Religion =

Series of philosophical aphorisms by William Blake

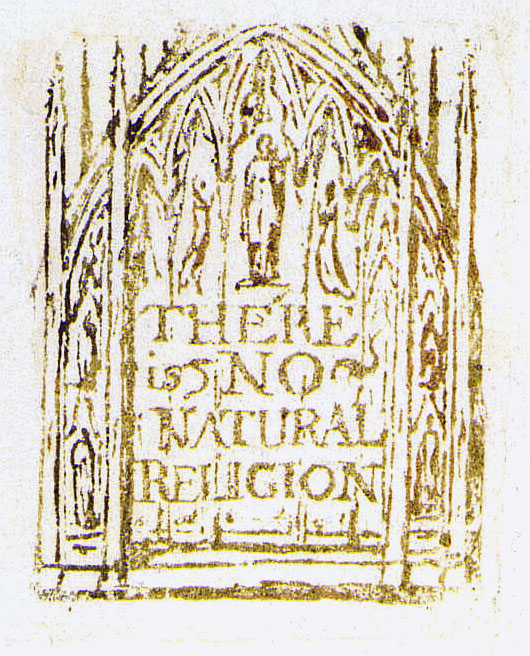
Title page from There is No Natural Religion, printed c1794

There is No Natural Religion is a series of philosophical aphorisms by William Blake, written in 1788. Following on from his initial experiments with relief etching in the non-textual The Approach of Doom (1787), All Religions are One and There is No Natural Religion represent Blake's first successful attempt to combine image and text via relief etching, and are thus the earliest of his illuminated manuscripts. As such, they serve as a significant milestone in Blake's career; as Peter Ackroyd points out, "his newly invented form now changed the nature of his expression. It had enlarged his range; with relief etching, the words inscribed like those of God upon the tables of law, Blake could acquire a new role."

== Relief etching ==
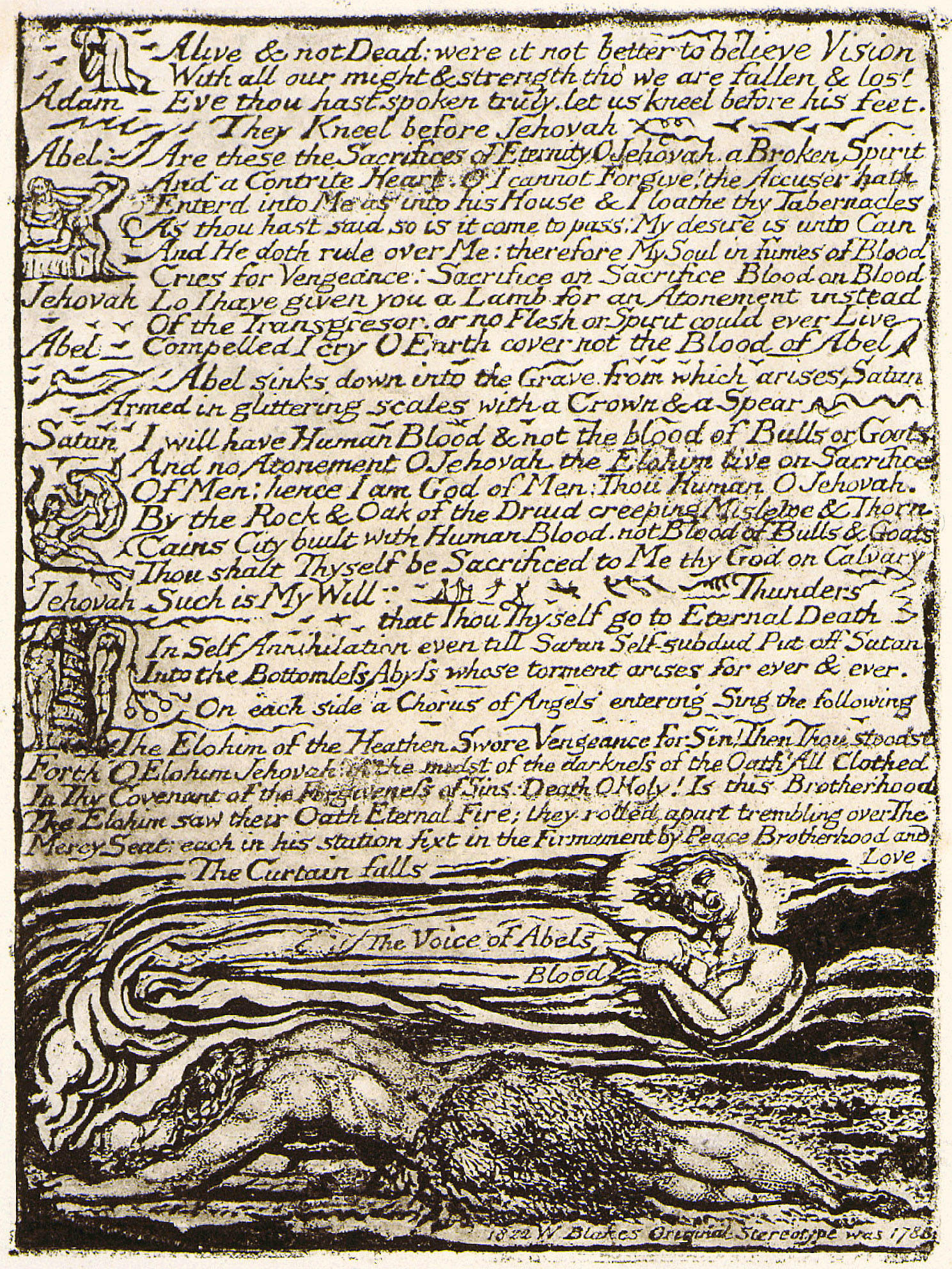
Page 2 of The Ghost of Abel (1822); note the writing in the colophon at bottom right.

In 1822, Blake completed a short two-page dramatic piece which would prove to be the last of his illuminated manuscripts, entitled The Ghost of Abel A Revelation In the Visions of Jehovah Seen by William Blake. Inscribed in the colophon of this text is "W Blakes Original Stereotype was 1788". It is almost universally agreed amongst Blakean scholars, that the "Original Stereotype" to which he here refers was All Religions are One and/or There is No Natural Religion.

During the 1770s, Blake had come to feel that one of the major problems with reproducing artwork in print was the division of labour by which it was achieved; one person would create a design (the artist), another would engrave it (the engraver), another print it (the printer) and another publish it (the publisher). It was unusual for artists to engrave their own designs, due primarily to the social status attached to each job; engraving was not seen as an especially exalted profession, and was instead regarded as nothing more than mechanical reproduction. Artists like James Barry and John Hamilton Mortimer were the exceptions to the norm insofar as they tended to engrave their own material. A further division in the process was that text and images were handled by different artisans; text was printed by means of a movable letterpress, whereas images were engraved, two very different jobs.

During Blake's training as a professional copy engraver with James Basire during the 1770s, the most common method of engraving was stippling, which was thought to give a more accurate impression of the original picture than the previously dominant method, line engraving. Etching was also commonly used for layering in such aspects as landscape and background. All traditional methods of engraving and etching were intaglio, which meant that the design's outline was traced with a needle through an acid-resistant 'ground' which had been poured over the copperplate. The plate was then covered with acid, and the engraver went over the incised lines with a burin to allow the acid to bite into the furrows and eat into the copper itself. The acid would then be poured off, leaving the design incised on the plate. The engraver would then engrave the plate's entire surface with a web of crosshatched lines, before pouring the ink onto the plate and transferring it to the printing press.

Frustrated with this method, Blake seems to have begun thinking about a new method of publishing at least as early as 1784, as in that year a rough description of what would become relief etching appears in his unpublished satire, An Island in the Moon. Around the same time, George Cumberland had been experimenting with a method to allow him to reproduce handwriting via an etched plate, and Blake incorporated Cumberland's method into his own relief etching; treating the text as handwritten script rather than mechanical letterpress, and thus allowing him to make it a component of the image.

Blake's great innovation in relief etching was to print from the relief, or raised, parts of the plate rather than the intaglio, or incised, parts. Whereas intaglio methods worked by creating furrows into which the acid was poured to create 'holes' in the plate and the ink then poured over the entire surface, Blake wrote and drew directly onto the plate with an acid-resistant material known as a stop-out. He would then embed the plate’s edges in strips of wax to create a self-contained tray and pour the acid about a quarter of an inch deep, thus causing the exposed parts of the plate to melt away, and the design and/or text to remain slightly above the rest of the plate, i.e. in relief, like a modern rubber stamp. The acid was then poured off, the wax was removed, and the raised part of the plate was covered with ink before finally being pressed onto the paper in the printing press. This method allowed expressive effects which were impossible to achieve via intaglio. The major disadvantage was that text had to be written backwards as whatever was on the plate would print in reverse when pressed onto the paper. The dominant theory as to how Blake solved this problem is simply that he wrote in reverse. Another theory, suggested by David Bindman, is that Blake wrote his (acid-resistant) text on a sheet of paper the correct way around, and then pressed the paper onto the plate, thus reversing the text and producing the same result as if had he written it backwards in the first place.

Blake could also colour the plates themselves in coloured inks before pressing them or tint them with watercolours after printing. Because of this aspect, a major component of relief etching was that every page of every book was a unique piece of art; no two copies of any page in Blake's entire oeuvre are identical. Variations in the actual print, different colouring choices, repainted plates, accidents during the acid bath etc., all led to multiple examples of the same plate.

Blake himself referred to relief etching as "printing in the infernal method, by means of corrosives [...] melting apparent surfaces away, and displaying the infinite which was hid." A contemporary description of the method was provided by Blake's friend, J.T. Smith; "writing his poetry, and drawing his marginal subjects of embellishments in outline upon the copper-plate with an impervious liquid, and then eating the plain parts or lights away with aquafortis considerably below them so that the outlines were left as Stereotype."

Relief etching was the same basic method used for woodcutting, and copper relief etching had been practised in the early 18th century by Elisha Kirkall, but Blake was the first to use such a method to create both words and designs mixed together on the same plate. Apart from the unique aesthetic effects possible, a major advantage of relief etching was that Blake could print the material himself. Because the text was in relief, the pressure needed for printing was constant, unlike in intaglio printing, where different pressures were needed to force the paper into the furrows, depending on size. Additionally, intaglio etchings and engravings were printed with great pressure, but in relief etching, because the printed material was a raised surface rather than incised lines, considerably less pressure was required. As such, relief etching tackled the problem of the division of labour of publishing. Blake's new method was autographic; "it permitted—indeed promoted—a seamless relationship between conception and execution rather than the usual divisions between invention and production embedded in 18th-century print technology, and its economic and social distinctions among authors, printers, artists and engravers. Like drawings and manuscripts, Blake's relief etchings were created by the direct and positive action of the author/artist's hand without intervening processes". Blake served as artist, engraver, printer and publisher.

== Copies ==
Bibliographically, No Natural Religion is one of the most complex and ambiguous of all of Blake's illuminated manuscripts. What is known for certain is that there were two printing sessions; one in 1794, and one in 1795, when a large paper copy was printed as part of a deluxe edition of Blake's collected illuminated manuscripts.

Although There is No Natural Religion was etched in 1788, whether Blake had printed it prior to 1794 is unknown. However, the fact that it is not mentioned in his 'To the Public' address of October 1793, where he listed all of his extant manuscripts up to that time except All Religions and No Natural Religion, would suggest he had not.

The 1794 printing consists of 87 known impressions of a total of twelve plates. These impressions comprise the majority of Copy A (British Museum), Copy B (Yale Center for British Art), Copy C (Library of Congress), Copy D (Houghton Library), Copy G (Morgan Library & Museum) and Copy M (Victoria and Albert Museum). All 87 impressions of the twelve plates have been colour printed in reddish-brown ink on the same type of paper. However, only Copy G (reproduced below) contains impressions of all 12 plates, although this copy was not assembled by Blake himself, but by John Linnell, after Blake's death, using unbound leaves found amongst Blake's possessions. Additionally, it was once thought that impressions from the 1794 print made up the majority of plates in Copy E, Copy F, Copy H, Copy I, Copy J and Copy K. However, in 1993, Joseph Viscomi proved that all but five of the plates in these copies are imitations. Copy E, Copy J and Copy K are composed entirely of imitations. Copy F and Copy H have two original impressions each, and the rest are imitations. Copy I has one original plate (a9; reproduced below as Plate a9 from Copy G is damaged). Viscomi believes the imitations may have been commissioned by the publisher Basil M. Pickering in the early 1860s.

From the 1795 printing, there is only one known set of impressions (Copy L), now held in the Morgan Library. However, although this second printing also contains 12 plates (with one missing), only four plates from the 1794 print were reprinted. The remaining seven plates are known only in this single impression. The black ink framing lines in Copy L are thought to have been added at a later date, possibly in 1818, just prior to when Blake gave the plates to John Linnell. It has been suggested that the framing lines may have been added due to the discrepancy between the size of the plates and the size of the paper (each plate is roughly 5.4 x 4 cm.; each page is 37.8 x 27 cm). In all copies other than Copy L, the plates are roughly 14 x 11 cm.

In numerous cases in both the 1794 print and the 1795 print, it seems as if the acid has eaten away too much of the relief, and Blake has had to go over sections with ink and wash, often touching the text and design outlines with pen. This ink and wash work may have been executed in 1818, along with the addition of the frame lines, although this cannot be ascertained for certain. Several of the plates also bear evidence of rudimentary colour printing, a method with which Blake was experimenting in the 1790s, and these plates may represent his first attempts at this technique (whereby he used coloured inks to print rather than black). Several of the plates also feature examples of white line engraving, a technique where Blake would literally cut into the stop-out to create tiny furrows, which would be eaten away by the acid, creating a streak effect in the final print.

All known copies of No Natural Religion were assembled from loose plates sold anonymously at Sotheby's on April 29, 1862, to Richard Monckton Milnes, and as such, there is no definitive order (except where the plates are numbered). Despite this lack of definitive order however, the sequence of the plates from the 1794 print is generally agreed to be the frontispiece, followed by the title page, then the Argument, then the plates numbered I–VI, followed by the plates reprinted in 1795. The order of the twelve plates from the 1795 print is generally agreed to be the frontispiece, followed by the title page, then the plates numbered I–VII, followed by the Conclusion, Application and the 'Therefore' plate. Traditionally, Blakean scholars tended to place the Conclusion after the Application, but since Mary Johnson and John E. Grant in 1979, this has been reversed.

After the original 1794 and 1795 printings, the text of There is No Natural Religion was not published until 1886, in a facsimile edition edited by William Muir.

== Series a and Series b ==
In 1886, William Muir attempted to impose an order on the various plates, but his efforts were not universally accepted. More successful was Geoffrey Keynes' attempt in 1971, and many of his decisions are still followed by modern editors. Keynes's most important, and controversial, editorial choice was to rigidly divide the two printing sessions into two distinct series, which came to be known as Series a and Series b. Specifically, he used the later addition of the framing lines in Series b (i.e. the 1795 print) to help him establish that Series as distinct from Series a (i.e. the 1794 print).

In Keynes' reordering, Series a comprises eight plates, one of which is missing (Plate a2 (title page); this is because the title page from the 1794 print is actually a version of the title page from the 1795 print, and as the title is thought to suit Series b better than Series a, it tends to be designated Plate b2 and assigned to Series b). Keynes also assigned the three plates from 1794 which were reprinted in 1795 to Series b, designating them b3, b4 and b12. As such, Series b comprises eleven plates, with at least one plate missing (Plate b5; III). In 1978, David Bindman suggested that there are more plates missing from Series b than just Plate 5, as he argued that the last three plates (Application, Conclusion and 'Therefore') are thematically isolated, suggesting more missing plates which should come after Plate b8 (VII). Bindman also saw the missing title page from Series a as important, arguing that although Series a was printed with the same title plate as Series b, there is no direct evidence that There is No Natural Religion is actually the correct title of Series a; "There is No Natural Religion would seem to be the title of Series b, and its content would be compatible with such a title; but there would then be no reason why Series a should have the same title."

Keynes' editorial decisions have been supported by most scholars since 1971, and editors of Blake's collected work in particular tend to adhere to the division into two distinct series'; for example, Alicia Ostriker's William Blake: The Complete Poems (1977), David Bindman's The Complete Graphic Works of William Blake (1978), David V. Erdman's 2nd edition of The Complete Poetry and Prose of William Blake (1982), and Bindman's 2nd edition of The Illuminated Blake: William Blake's Complete Illuminated Works (1992), and The Complete Illuminated Books of William Blake (2003).

== One series or two? ==
However, Keynes' theories have not been accepted by all Blakean scholars. For example, in Blake's Illuminated Books, Volume 3: The Early Illuminated Books (1993), Morris Eaves, Robert N. Essick and Joseph Viscomi argue that the two Series are one, and the only difference between the 1794 and 1795 prints is that the 1794 print is an abridged version of the whole, and only the second half of the work was printed in 1795. They argue that "the existence of only one title, as well as the c.1794 abridgement containing plates from both groups, suggest that the work was etched not as two separate Series but as a single work arranged into two parts, the second answering the first." If this is correct, Series a cannot stand alone, as the irony found within it is only revealed when it is contrasted with Series b and thus, were it to be interpreted alone, "Blake would have appeared to contemporary readers as an advocate of the very position he is attacking." This argument has been accepted by several modern editors of Blake's work, such as W.H. Stevenson in the 3rd edition of Blake: The Complete Poems (2007).

An important component of Keynes' theory was that the three plates from the 1794 print reprinted in 1795, formed a part of Series b, not Series a. However, if they are included with Series a (such as in Bindman's The Complete Graphic Works of William Blake), they come at the end; plates numbered I & II to refute the theories of the previous plates, followed by the 'Therefore' plate to bring the work to a close. As such, Eaves, Essick and Viscomi argue that the 1794 print represents a twelve-plate abridgement (the twelve plates are a1, a2/b2, a3-9, b3-4 and b12). They argue that "the b-series plates provide a brief but bold refutation of the empirical and materialist principles offered on the preceding pages and indicate the irony with which Blake offers the first group of aphorisms." They especially argue that the abridgement theory is supported by plates a9 and b3, which is the crossover point from irony to refutation. Plate a9 depicts a prone figure with his head on the right, whereas plate b3 is a mirror image, a figure with his head on the left; "this visual reversal complements the sudden change of philosophical perspective in the accompanying text." The plates are also ideologically in direct opposition; they both deal with perceptions and organs of sense, but whereas a9 asserts that man can experience through such organs only, b3 states that this is patently false, and perceptions can go beyond organs of sense. Plate b4 elaborates on this theory, and plate b12 fulfils the prophecy of what will happen "when we know more." Thus the series forms a coherent, if brief, statement. As to the question of why Blake omitted the rest of the plates, Eaves, Essick and Viscomi argue that plates b6-11 deal with issues which thematically wouldn't fit into the abridgement—hence the 1794 print represents a streamlined version of the overall thesis; "a statement on the empiricist theory of perception followed by its direct and forceful rebuttal."

A major question related to the 1795 print is why did Blake only print Series b (or under Eaves, Essick and Viscomi's terms, the second half of the overall work). There are two possibilities. Perhaps he did print the entire work, but Series a (i.e. the first half) was lost. The second theory is that he may have printed only Series b as he wanted it to exist as a companion to the 1795 print of All Religions; "the decision to delete the first sequence may have been motivated by a desire to create an eleven-page companion to All Religions are One, a work in ten plates. Both are positive statements of Blake's principles; the presence of the ironic first sequence of propositions from There is No Natural Religion would have come between and disrupted the symmetrical relationship between the companion works." In support of this theory is the fact that Copy L of No Natural Religion was printed on the same paper and in the same ink as the only existing copy of All Religions, and also has the same framing lines.

Taking all of this into consideration, it is possible, however tentative, to suggest what the original appearance of the overall work may have been when first etched in 1788. Eaves, Essick and Viscomi propose the following order:

- Plate a1 (frontispiece with elderly couple and shepherds)
- Plate a2 (title page)
- Plate a3 (The Argument)
- Plate a4 (I. "Man cannot conceive...")
- Plate a5 (II. "Man by his reasoning power alone...")
- Plate a6 (III. "From a perception...")
- Plate a7 (IV. "None could have...")
- Plate a8 (V. "Mans desires are limited...")
- Plate a9 (VI. "The desires and perceptions...")
- Plate b3 (I. "Mans perceptions are not bounded...")
- Plate b4 (II. "Reason or the ratio...")
- Plate b5 (III. Untraced plate)
- Plate b6 (IV. "The bounded is loathed...")
- Plate b7 (V. "If the many become...")
- Plate b8 (VI. "If any could desire...")
- Plate b9 (VII. "The desires of Man being Infinit...")
- Plate b10 (Conclusion)
- Plate b11 (Application)
- Plate b12 ('Therefore')
- Plate b1 (full plate design usually treated as a frontispiece to Series b)

Although it is possible that plate b1 served as a divider between the two series, Eaves, Essick and Viscomi believe it was a tailpiece to the overall work. In that position, it would mirror the only other full plate design (the frontispiece). Also, the graphical content would suggest it as a tailpiece, as it returns to the gothic architecture of the title page. It also serves as an illustration of plate b12 ('Therefore') insofar as it depicts a resurrection where we become as God is; "the work therefore ends with its most hopeful and religious concept, the restoration of humanity to spiritual life" insofar as "the plate holds out the promise of a resurrection from the 'death' of Lockean philosophy and into the life of the spirit."

== Dating ==
Until 1971, most editors tended to consider All Religions are One as later than There is No Natural Religion. For example, in his 1905 book The poetical works of William Blake; a new and verbatim text from the manuscript engraved and letterpress originals, John Sampson places No Natural Religion prior to All Religions in his 'Appendix to the Prophetic Books'. However, in 1971, Geoffrey Keynes argued that All Religions are One was the earlier of the two, based on what he saw as its "greater technical imperfection." In his 1978 book, The Complete Graphic Works of William Blake, David Bindman initially disagreed with Keynes, arguing that the imperfections in All Religions are not because of an earlier date of composition, but because of the increased complexity of the plates, with such complexity demonstrating Blake growing in confidence from the more rudimentary plates for No Natural Religion. Most scholars however support Keynes, and All Religions are One precedes There is No Natural Religion in almost all modern anthologies of Blake's work; for example, Alicia Ostriker's William Blake: The Complete Poems (1977), David V. Erdman's 2nd edition of The Complete Poetry and Prose of William Blake (1982), Morris Eaves', Robert N. Essick's and Joseph Viscomi's Blake's Illuminated Books, Volume 3: The Early Illuminated Books (1993), even Bindman's own The Complete Illuminated Books of William Blake (2003), and W. H. Stevenson's 3rd edition of Blake: The Complete Poems (2007).

Further evidence for Keynes's hypothesis is discussed by Eaves, Essick and Viscomi, who, in counterpoint to Bindman, see the style of No Natural Religion as more confident than that of All Religions. They especially cite the use of upright roman lettering in All Religions contrasted with the italic, cursive writing on several plates of No Natural Religion; italic text "was easier to execute since it required fewer independent strokes. And since the resulting dense matrix of lines provided better support for the inking dabber, italic permitted a shallower etch." Blake introduced italic script on plate a3 of No Natural Religion, a script which he would use throughout the 1790s. Other evidence for an earlier dating of All Religions is that many of the individual letters themselves lean to the left, unlike in No Natural Religion. This was a common problem in mirror writing, and its presence in All Religions but not No Natural Religion suggests Blake was only learning how to overcome it as he worked.

== Content ==
When analysing No Natural Religion it is important to remember that the images are not necessarily literal depictions of the text; "the philosophical propositions [...] offer little visual imagery or even named objects. These qualities may have determined the relative independence of many of the designs from the accompanying text. The links are thematic and metaphoric, not direct and literal."

=== 1794 print ===
Number	Image	Text	Description	Notes
Plate a1 (frontispiece)		The Author & Printer W Blake	On the right, two young men, both naked, stand by a tree. The man farthest to the left holds a shepherd's crook in his right hand. On the left is seated an elderly couple, both wearing gowns. Another tree can be seen on the left margin, with its branches forming a canopy over the couple. In the distance, mountains are visible.	From Copy G. In the six known original impressions of this plate, "The Author & Printer W Blake" has been printed at the bottom of the page, but in Copy G, the text has been obscured by wash. Also, in all six impressions, the phrase is written in reverse, presumably because Blake forgot to write it in mirror lettering. In three of the six impressions (from Copies D, G and M) the young man's staff has been drawn in with black ink after the print; in the other three (from Copies A, B and C), the staff cannot be seen. Eaves, Essick and Viscomi believe the image has connections to Ancient Greece, and is also symbolic of the structure of There is No Natural Religion as a whole. They suggest the posture of the man on the far right may be modelled after Praxiteles' Hermes and the Infant Dionysus, and the elderly man on the left may be sitting on a form of flutter-column "which suggests a classical setting and culture identified with the origins of rationalist philosophies. The differences in age and clothing between the two sets of figures structurally parallel the juxtaposition between natural and revealed religion in the text that follows."
Plate a2 (Title page)		THERE is NO; NATURAL; RELIGION	The Gothic structure in which the title is embedded may be a church façade or a tomb canopy. The words of the title are incorporated diegetically into the design.	From Copy G. There are seven figures in the arches surrounding the title. Most are impossible to identify, but the largest figure, in the centre, appears to be the Virgin Mary holding the Christ child, with two praying figures on her left and right. The finials on the four front spires may be based on those of the tomb of Edmund Crouchback, 1st Earl of Lancaster in the north transept of Westminster Abbey, which Blake had sketched c.1774.
Plate a3 (Argument)		The Argument Man has no notion of moral fitness but from education Naturally he is only a natu- ral organ subject to Sense.	In the main picture, a woman is seated in a chair. Her legs are crossed and she holds a book, from which she appears to be reading. On the right stands a young girl, also holding a book from which she reads. On the left, a young boy is lying on the ground with his torso propped up on his left elbow. He too appears to be reading. Numerous tiny figures can also be seen in the vicinity of the words "The Argument". Furthest on the left, a figure leans against the vertical of the "T" in "The". Moving to the right, another figure, possibly winged, hovers above the space between "The" and "Argument". Next, a figure leans against the left diagonal of the "A". Another figure stands by the right diagonal of the "A" reaching up to the right towards a bird above the "u" and "m." Additionally, the first and last letters of the heading expand out into vines, as does the final "n" in "Education" in the main text.	From Copy G. Three of the six original impressions of this plate are in colour (from Copies C, G and M; although all three differ from one another in their colouration), and three are in monochrome (from Copies A, B and D). The picture is probably a symbolic depiction of the education mentioned in the text. However, even here, Blake introduces a sense of contrariness, as the figures mingled amongst the text "may suggest a source of education more energetic and spiritual than can be provided by the books and vegetation below."
Plate a4 (I)		I Man cannot naturally Per- cieve, but through his natural or bodily organs	An old man, naked, leans on a walking stick and looks down at a dog on the ground, which looks up at him. In the background can be seen a hill and a clump of trees. A tree also grows on the right margin, a branch of which forms a canopy over the old man. Another branch extends to the top of the plate and separates the heading and the first line of text. At the far end of this branch, sits a tiny human figure, with a number of birds flying above him.	From Copy G. Three of the six original impressions of this plate are in colour (from Copies C, G and M; although all three differ from one another in their colouration), and three are in monochrome (from Copies A, B and D). The image is a metaphorical depiction of the text, with the old man perceiving through his bodily organs (his eyes). The dog may carry the symbolic association that Man's organic perceptions are no better or different than animals', i.e. if Man limits himself to his organic senses and adheres to the principals of Empiricism, he is no different, or better, than a mere animal; it is only by the acceptance of the spiritual and the imagination, faculties unavailable to animals and unique to Man, that he can rise above a strictly physical existence. Blake would return to this concept in the planographic print Nebuchadnezzar (c.1795/1805). The posture of the man is based on that of a centurion in Raphael's Liberation of Saint Peter (1514). As in the previous plate, with the small figures interacting with the text, "Blake has established an opposition between limited perceptions on the ground below the text and livlier, freer motifs above."
Plate a5 (II)		II Man by his reason- ing power. can only compare & judge of what he has already perceiv'd	In the main picture at the bottom of the plate, a woman kneels on the ground, holding onto the waist of a small child, probably male. The child is reaching towards a small bird which seems to be flying away from him. At the top of the plate, a branch from a bare tree divides the heading from the text.	From Copy G. The image of the child reaching for the bird is similar to the picture on Plate a8 (V), and as such may represent the concept of "Desires" as introduced on that plate. If this is so, the image here could represent the struggle between physical limits (represented by the restraining mother) and the desires which necessarily transcend those limits (as explained in Series b). Regarding the prominent image of the tree, David Bindman believes that it is bare to symbolise the rigid "reasoning power" dominating Mankind.
Plate a6 (III)		III From a perception of only 3 senses or 3 ele -ments none could de- -duce a fourth or fifth	A man with a beard sits on the ground, reaching to the left with both arms. A winged putto, visible from the waist up, appears behind the man's legs, and reaches towards the man's shoulder with his left hand. His right hand is pointed upwards. A tree grows on the right margin and branches out both above and below the heading.	From Copy G. The presence of the putto, and his gesture of pointing heavenward may indicate the spiritual perceptions beyond the reach of the "3 senses". However, as Bindman notes, it is significant that the man does not look at or reach towards the putto or the sky. As such, if the putto or what he points at represent spiritual perceptions, the man is ignoring both of them, and concentrating instead on what his organic senses can perceive.
Plate a7 (IV)		IV None could have other than natural or organic thoughts if he had none but organic perceptions	A man sits on the ground with his back against a tree, playing a pipe. He wears a hat decorated with feathers. The landscape on the right features a small hill and a grove of trees. A single tree extends up the left margin. Three birds fly above the text and on each side of the heading.	From Copy G. The image could depict the "organic perceptions" mentioned in the text—the piper is creating his art by means of an organic process. However, although he creates his art via his physical organs, it is a process dependent on imagination, and as such, Bindman believes the birds symbolise the music of the poet, flying upwards into infinite air and thus beyond the organic perceptions which seem to triumph in the previous plate.
Plate a8 (V)		V Mans desires are limited by his percepti ons. none can de- -sire what he has not perciev'd	In the main image, a boy moves towards a stream, his arms outstretched, reaching towards a swan in the water. A tree grows on the left margin and branches above the heading.	From Copy G. As with Plate a5 (II), the boy reaching for the swan could represent the theme of "Mans desires". Bindman argues that the absence of the restraining mother figure from a5 is important here as it suggests that the boy has freed himself from physical constraints, and is now free to pursue his desires.
Plate a9 (VI)		VI The desires & percepti- -ons of man untaught by any thing but organs of sense, must be limited to objects of sense.	A man lies on the ground with his upper body propped up on his arms, holding his head in his left hand. Long grass grows in front of him and a tree grows behind the grass. The tree branches both above and below the heading.	From Copy I (the impression in Copy G is damaged). The posture of the figure is indicative of traditional melancholy. The vegetation above him could symbolise the upper limits of physical perceptions.
Plate b3 (I)		I Mans percepti- -ons are not bound -ed by organs of perception, he per- -cieves more than sense (tho' ever so acute) can discover	At the bottom of the plate, a gowned man with a beard lies on the ground, reading from a book. On the left is the stump of a tree. The first letter on the first line, "M", extends into a vine and reaches up to the heading.	From Copy G. Continuing the theme of reading from the previous plate, this picture is a mirror-image of the last one, but with subtle differences, which carry great thematic weight; "the vegetation near his head seems stunted, but the energetic scroll-like form above his body and the way the 'M' beginning the text bursts into vegetative form hint at energetic perceptions beyond the vision of this "bounded" reader." Thus the 'barrier' formed by the tree in the previous plate is absent here, suggesting the possibility of the freedom of Man's spiritual faculties.
Plate b4 (II)		II Reason or the ra- -tio of all we have already known, is not the same that it shall be when we know more	A man lies flat on the ground, his face turned upwards, his arms are at his side. His head rests on what seems to be a cushion. Above and to the right is a small and difficult-to-discreet figure hovering in the air, who seems to be reaching towards the left. Vines fill the spaces both left and right of the heading, the one on the right may have berries.	From Copy G. It is impossible to say if the man is sleeping or dead. Irrespective of this however, again, Blake can be seen contrasting the limited world of physicality below (the man himself) with the energetic world above (the twirls both immediately above the man and above the text itself).
Plate b12 (Therefore)		Therefore God becomes as we are, that we may be as he is	Below the text, a man lies on a bed, facing outwards towards the reader. He seems to have lines of radiance emanating from his head. Several vines decorate the spaces all around the heading ("Therefore"). Another vine descends down the right margin near the third and fourth lines of text. On the left, the last letter of "may" extends into a small vine. Vines also surround the final word on the plate, "is", which is on a line on its own.	From Copy G. Although there is no way of knowing if the man is living or dead, the motif of the beams of radiance suggest he may be Christ, and thus the "God" who "becomes as/we are, that we/may be as he/is." S. Foster Damon interprets this image as depicting an Incarnation, and the text as echoing the words of Athanasius; "He indeed assumed humanity that we might become God" (The Incarnation of the Word of God, 54). However "where the theologians all use the past tense, as of a historical event, Blake uses the present tense, for the act is eternal and is always going on." Robert N. Essick believes the design perfectly reflects the text; "the Word (Blake's text) becomes the flesh (branches, leaves, etc); the flesh becomes the Word."

=== 1795 print ===
Number	Image	Text	Description	Notes
Plate b1 (frontispiece)		No text	A man with long hair stands on the left, facing right, his left arm extended out horizontally. Lying on the ground in front of him is another man, reaching up towards the extended hand of the standing man. In the background can be seen two Gothic arches.	From Copy L. The standing figure may be Christ, resurrecting Lazarus, as described in John, 12:17. The arches in the background suggest the setting may be a church, and seem to bear a resemblance to the tomb of John of Eltham in Westminster Abbey.
Plate b2 (title page)		THERE is NO; NATURAL; RELIGION		From Copy L. Same plate as printed in 1794, except for the size and framing lines.
Plate b3 (I)		I Mans percepti- -ons are not bound -ed by organs of perception, he per- -cieves more than sense (tho' ever so acute) can discover		From Copy L. Same plate as printed in 1794, except for the size and framing lines.
Plate b4 (II)		II Reason or the ra- -tio of all we have already known, is not the same that it shall be when we know more		From Copy L. Same plate as printed in 1794, except for the size and framing lines.
Plate b5 (III)			Presumably there was once a plate containing III. Eaves, Essick and Viscomi suggest that it most likely dealt with the reintroduction of desire so as to free it from the constraints imposed upon it in Series a.	No impressions of Plate b5 have ever been located.
Plate b6 (IV)		IV The bounded is loathed by its pos- -sessor, The same dull round even of a univere would soon become a mill with complica- -ted wheels.	At the top of the plate, a vine fills the space above the text and to both the left and the right of the heading. A vine also runs along the bottom of the plate.	From Copy L. The only plate in Blake's two series in which there is no image of any kind, other than the vines at the top and bottom. However, the energetic vegetation could be interpreted as symbolising an escape from the "dull round" of empiricism.
Plate b7 (V)		V If the many be- -come the same as the few, when pos- -sess'd, More! More! is the cry of a mista ken soul, less than All cannot satisfy Man	At the top of the plate, vines fill the spaces to both the left and the right of the heading. At the bottom of the plate, to both the left and right of the last word, "Man", which is on a line on its own, hover two small figures, each of which seem to be praying. Vines grow around both figures.	From Copy L. The two figures serve to complement the energetic vegetation introduced in the last plate. Whereas there, only vegetation was depicted as inherently energetic, here, the form of Man is introduced, as he also begins to reject empiricism.
Plate b8 (VI)		VI If any could de- -sire what he is in- -capable of posses- sing, despair must be his eternal lot	Below the text, a naked man, very muscular, sits on the ground, chains running from each ankle, and a shackle on the right ankle. His head is bowed over, looking at the ground and he clutches his head with both hands.	From Copy L. The presence of the shackle and chains suggests imprisonment and confinement. Additionally, the posture of the man and the way he clutches his head, suggests the "despair" mentioned in the text. Blake would reuse this image in both America a Prophecy (1793) and The Book of Urizen (1794).
Plate b9 (VII)		VII The desire of Man being Infi- -nite the possession is Infinite & him- -self Infinite	At the bottom of the plate, a young man (very possibly the same man from the previous plate) seems to rise from the earth, his hands reaching out for something unseen. He seems to be looking above him, into the sky.	From Copy L. The man is representative of all Men, and is rising from the physical to embrace the unseen Infinite, having shaken off the chains restraining him in the previous plate. Also important is that "for the first time in the illustrations, the main human figure expresses the energy of the vegetative motifs."
Plate b10 (conclusion)		Conclusion If it were not for the Poetic or Prophetic character. the Philo- -sophic & Experimen- -tal would soon be at the ratio of all things. & stand still, unable to do other than repeat the same dull round over a- -gain	Vines, possibly with leaves, fill the spaces above, below, and on both sides of the heading. Leafless vines fill the spaces on both the right and left margins of the plate. More vines grow near the bottom of the plate on each side of the last line. The vines enter the text at two points; a small self-contained vine appears between "-tal" and "would" in line 5, and the vine on the right margin extends into the text at the word "all" on line 6.	From Copy L. Although, like Plate b6, this plate contains only vines, they are intermingled with the text in a way quite unlike any of the other plates.
Plate b11 (application)		Application He who sees the In- -finite in all things sees God. He who sees the Ratio only sees himself only	At the bottom of the plate, a bearded man with long hair kneels on the ground and leans forward. His right hand holds a compass, with which he seems to be measuring the foot of a triangle inscribed on the ground. On the left margin stands a tree, one of its branches arching over the man, another extending up the margin and dividing the text from the header above it.	From Copy L. The man measuring the triangle refers to the concept of "the Ratio" as mentioned in the text. "Ratio" is from the Latin for "Reason" ("Rationis"), and for Harold Bloom, "Ratio, in Blake's use, means an abstract image or ghost of an object, which in the aggregate makes up the universe of death which is the natural experience of most men." Similarly, for Peter Otto, the plate depicts Nebuchadnezzar II as "Locke's Reason, closed within the 'Closet' of the mind while the triangle is one of the simple ideas that in Locke’s system provide the primary building blocks of knowledge." For Eaves, Essick and Viscomi, the plate depicts enslavement to "abstract reason and bondage to material nature. The latter is emphasised by the barren tree and other vegetation that curve over the figure as though to entrap him." Essick sees the illustration as a visual pun; the literal application of Reason to the earth (represented by the ground) itself. David Bindman speculates that Blake may have been inspired in this image by an engraving he had done in 1782 after a Thomas Stothard design for the frontispiece of An Introduction to Mensuration by John Bonnycastle, which depicts a young child measuring some triangles. Eaves, Essick and Viscomi suggest Blake may have been building on Raphael's depiction of Euclid in The School of Athens (1511). Blake himself would use this image as the basis for two of his later planographic prints, Nebuchadnezzar (where he mirrors the posture) and Newton (where he mirrors the action; both c.1795/1805).
Plate b12 ('Therefore')		Therefore God becomes as we are, that we may be as he is		From Copy L. Same plate as printed in 1794, except for the size and framing lines.

=== Additional content ===
Number	Image	Text	Description	Notes
Plate a1 (frontispiece)				From Copy B. An alternate version of plate a1 in which the man's staff has not been drawn in ink after the print. Note that the backwards writing in the colophon is visible in this impression.
Plate a3 (The Argument)				An alternately coloured version of plate a3 from Copy C.
Plate a3 (The Argument)				A monochrome version of plate a3 from Copy B.
Plate a4 (I)				An alternately coloured version of plate a4 from Copy C.
Plate a4 (I)				A monochrome version of plate a4 from Copy B.

== Interpretation ==
One of the most immediately obvious aspects of the two series is how they fundamentally contradict one another. In Series a, Blake explicitly states that Man is purely physical and limited to that physicality; "Naturally he is only a natural organ subject to sense", and he "cannot naturally Perceive. But through his natural or bodily organs." Because of this, Man can only understand that which he has already encountered (i.e. he cannot understand something he has not encountered, because to do so would involve faculties beyond the physical senses); Man "can only compare & judge of what he has already perceiv'd." Man cannot even extrapolate new comprehensions by combining old ones; "From a perception of only 3 sense or 3 elements none could deduce a fourth or fifth." Thus, because man is limited by organic physicality ("None could have other than natural or organic thoughts if he had none but organic perceptions"), both his thoughts and his desires are so limited; "Mans desires are limited by his perceptions. none can desire what he has not perceiv'd." As such, "The desires & perceptions of man untaught by any thing but organs of sense, must be limited to organs of sense." Overall, Series a serves as a declaration of extreme empiricism, which goes much further than any of the empiricist theorists ever took it.

Series b however, completely refutes the basic concepts of empiricism. It begins by declaring that "Mans perceptions are not bounded by organs of perception, he perceives more than sense (thou' ever so acute) can discover." As such, Man can indeed discover aspects beyond his own immediate experience; "Reason or the ratio of all we have already known. is not the same as it shall be when we know more." Blake points out that Man is fundamentally desirous of discovering more and moving beyond the bounds of his specific physicality, which is nothing more than a restriction; "The bounded is loathed by its possessor." As a result, Man yearns to know that which he does not yet know because "Less than all cannot satisfy Man." However, Man should never desire more than he can possess, because "if any could desire what he is incapable of possessing, despair must be his eternal lot." However, because Man tends to desire the infinite, thus "the desire of Man being Infinite the possession is Infinite & himself Infinite." That is to say, if Man can only desire what he can possess, yet he desires the infinite, then he must be able to possess the infinite. Blake takes from this that if Man's desires and possessions can be infinite, then Man too must be Infinite, and, by extension, Man can see the Infinite. Indeed, not to see the Infinite is a perversion of Man's true nature, as defined by the Poetic Genius; "If it were not for the Poetic or Prophetic character. the Philosophic & Experimental would soon be at the ratio of all things & stand still, unable to do other than repeat the same dull round over again"; i.e. Man is made to do more than perceive and experience through the senses only. Furthermore, to see the Infinite is to see God, which is to transcend the sensate ("the Ratio"); "He who sees the Infinite in all things sees God. He who sees the Ratio only sees himself only." Therefore, for Man to see God, he must be as God, and as such, "God becomes as we are that we may be as he is."

David Bindman summarises There is No Natural Religion as "an early and fundamental statement of [Blake's] philosophical beliefs, expressed in the rational language of 18th-century philosophers." In line with this way of thinking, S. Foster Damon suggests that "the first series states John Locke's philosophy of the five senses until it becomes self-evidently absurd." A similar conclusion is reached by Denise Vultee, who argues that both All Religions are One and There is No Natural Religion are "part of Blake's lifelong quarrel with the philosophy of Bacon, Newton, and Locke. Rejecting the rational empiricism of 18th-century deism or "natural religion", which looked to the material world for evidence of God's existence, Blake offers as an alternative the imaginative faculty or "Poetic Genius"." In this sense, No Natural Religion is a "mockery of rationalism and an insistence on Man's potential infinitude."

However, as well as attacking the theories of empiricism, Blake also engages with the concept of natural religion. Northrop Frye argues that "Theology distinguishes between "natural" and "revealed" religion, the former being the vision of God which man develops with his fallen reason, and the later the vision communicated to him by inspired prophets. To Blake, there is no natural religion. The only reason people believe in it is because they are unwilling to believe in the identity of God and Man." For Harold Bloom, because Blake is able to see the identity of God and man, the rejection of Locke and the tenets of deism makes way for a system in which "to see the infinite in all things is to see God because it is to see as God sees, which Blake believes is the only way to see God. But to see as God sees, man must himself be infinite, a state to be attained only by the individual utterly possessed by the Poetic character." Similarly, "there is no natural religion, according to Blake, because no man reasoning from fallen nature can come to see that "the real man, the imagination" and God are the same. Religion must be "revealed" in the sense that Revelation means the consuming of natural appearance by a more imaginative vision." Along these same lines, Eaves, Essick and Viscomi argue that, for Blake, natural religion is a "contradiction in terms antithetical to religious belief. Natural religion is derived from experience provided by the fallen senses, not from the Poetic Genius. Thus it is not a religion and cannot be included in the 'all' of All Religions are One."

In Blake's ironic treatment of empirical doctrines and natural religion, a key element introduced in Series b is desire; "the rational mind, merely a mechanical manipulation or "ratio" of sense experience, "shall be" transformed as spiritual enlightenment advances and we discover more than "organic perceptions" allow. If it were not for desires reaching beyond the sensate, Man would be trapped in a self-imposed empiricist prison. For Blake, expanding the prison or accumulating more will not bring any respite, as only the Infinite will satisfy Man. If we could not attain the infinite, we would be in eternal despair, but because we are not, Blake reasons that we thus must be able to attain the Infinite, and as such, Man becomes Infinite himself; "Locke's principle of a reciprocal and mutually validating relationship among the mind, the sense organs, and their objects has been converted into a similarly structured reciprocity among infinite desire, its infinite object, and its infinite desirer."

In terms of influences, in 1787 Henry Fuseli was working on a translation of J. K. Lavater's Aphorisms on Man for the publisher Joseph Johnson, when he hired Blake to engrave the frontispiece. Blake became so enamoured of Lavater's work that on the inside cover of his own copy of the book, he inscribed both his name and Lavater's, and drew a heart encompassing them. Blake also extensively annotated his own copy of Aphorisms, and a number of critics have noted parallels between the Lavater annotations and Blake's own aphorisms in both All Religions and No Natural Religion. S. Foster Damon specifically points to Lavater's first two aphorisms as having a strong influence on Blake;

1. Know, in the first place, that mankind agree in essence, as they do in their limbs and senses.
2. Mankind differ as much in essence as they do in form, limbs, and senses - and only so, and not more".

To these points, Blake has annotated "This is true Christian philosophy far above all abstraction.

The importance of Francis Bacon, Isaac Newton and John Locke is paramount to the work, and it is known that Blake despised empiricism from an early age. c.1808, he annotated Volume 1 of The Works of Sir Joshua Reynolds, edited by Edmond Malone, and wrote

Burke's Treatise on the Sublime & Beautiful is founded on the Opinions of Newton & Locke on this Treatise Reynolds has grounded many of his assertions. in all his Discourses I read Burkes Treatise when very Young at the same time I read Locke on Human Understanding & Bacons Advancement of Learning on Every one of these Books I wrote my Opinions & on looking them over find that my Notes on Reynolds in this Book are exactly Similar. I felt the Same Contempt & Abhorrence then; that I do now. They mock Inspiration & Vision Inspiration & Vision was then & now is & I hope will always Remain my Element my Eternal Dwelling place. how can I then hear it Contemnd without returning Scorn for Scorn

The extreme empiricism of Series a closely mirrors some of the theories espoused by Locke and Bacon. For example, Blake's assertion that Man cannot deduce any other senses is specifically based on Bacon; "Man, being the servant and interpreter of nature, can do and understand so much and so much only as he has observed in fact or in thought of the course of nature beyond this he neither knows anything nor can do anything" and Locke; "it is not possible for any one to imagine any other Qualities in Bodies, howsoever constituted, whereby they can be taken notice of, besides Sounds, Tastes, Smells, visible and tangible Qualities. And had Mankind been made but with four Senses, the Qualities then, which are the Object of the Fifth Sense, had been as far from our Notice, Imagination, and Conception, as now any belonging to a Sixth, Seventh, or Eighth Sense, can possibly be." However, Locke did argue that Man could build on simple ideas and create a complex concept of spirituality; "Moral Beings and Notions are founded on, and terminated in these simple Ideas we have received from Sensation or Reflection." Blake ironically rejects this notion, arguing instead that just as Man cannot deduce more senses than he has, he cannot deduce ideas beyond those immediately perceivable by the senses. This claim, that Man cannot desire anything beyond his senses (such as transcendence), is going much further than either Locke or Bacon, neither of whom made any such assertion.

Harold Bloom also cites the work of Anthony Collins, Matthew Tindal and John Toland as having an influence on Blake's thoughts. In a more general sense, "Blake sees the school of Bacon and Locke as the foundation of natural religion, the deistic attempt to prove the existence of God on the basis of sensate experience and its rational investigation." To that end, Blake "manipulates the syncretic mythology of Jacob Bryant, Paul Henri Mallet, and perhaps other founders of what has become the comparative study of religion, to argue for the existence of a universal and supra-rational 'Poetic Genius' that expresses itself through the shared (though ever various) forms of all religions."

In relation to his later work, Northrop Frye sees All Religions are One and There is No Natural Religion as forming a fundamental statement of intent for Blake, a kind of pre-emptive outline of his future work, "a summarised statement of the doctrines of the engraved canon." Similarly, Morris Eaves, Robert N. Essick and Joseph Viscomi state that they "contain some of Blake's most fundamental principles and reveal the foundation for later development in his thought and art." W.H. Stevenson calls them "a very early statement of fundamental opinions [Blake] held all his life." As an example of how Blake returned to the specific themes of No Natural Religion, in Milton a Poem (1804–1810), he writes "This Natural Religion! this impossible absurdity" (40:13), and in Jerusalem The Emanation of the Giant Albion (1804-1820), "Natural Religion and Natural Philosophy are the Religion of the Pharisees who murdered Jesus" (52: "To the Deists"). He also repeats the important phrase "dull round" in his 1809 Descriptive Catalogue; "Historians pretend, who being weakly organized themselves, cannot see either miracle or prodigy; all is to them a dull round of probabilities and possibilities."
