= Ardach =

Ardach, or Àrdach, meaning 'high field' in Gaelic languages, may be anglicised to:

- Ardagh (disambiguation), mainly in Ireland
- Ardoch (disambiguation), in various countries
