= Ardagh (surname) =

Ardagh is a toponymic surname, from the Irish place name Ardagh (from Irish Gaelic ard áth, "high field"). Notable people with the surname include:

== Politics ==
- Catherine Ardagh (born 1982), Irish politician, Senator for the Industrial and Commercial Panel
- Dick Ardagh (1871–1931), Australian politician
- Seán Ardagh (1947–2016), Irish politician, TD for Dublin South-Central
- William Davis Ardagh (1828–1893), Canadian politician

== Other ==
- John Ardagh (1928–2008), British writer
- John Charles Ardagh (1840–1907), British Army officer
- Osmond Ardagh (1900–1954), English cricketer
- Philip Ardagh (born 1961), British writer

== See also ==
- Henry de Ardagh, Dean of Armagh, Church of Ireland, in the 13th century
- Mél of Ardagh (died 488), Irish saint, nephew of St. Patrick
