= Omnism =

Recognition and respect all beliefs or lack thereof

Omnism is the epistemological and theological position in philosophy that all religions contain varying degrees of truth, but no single religion can offer a fully true teleology. Omnism is related to syncretism, or the practice of combining multiple belief systems.

== Contemporary usage ==
Contemporary usage has modified "belief in all religions" to refer more to an acceptance of the legitimacy of all religions. The Oxford English Dictionary elaborates that an omnist believes "in a single transcendent purpose or cause uniting all things or people." Omnists interpret this to mean that all religions contain varying elements of a common truth, that omnists are open to potential truths from all religions. The Oxford dictionary defines an omnist as "a person who believes in all faiths or creeds; a person who believes in a single transcendent purpose or cause uniting all things or people, or the members of a particular group of people." Edward Herbert, 1st Baron Herbert of Cherbury, considered the first Deist, argued that all religions were true. In the poem All Religions are One, William Blake professed that every religion originated from God's revelation. Henry Stubbe and other Socinians syncretized Unitarianism with Islamic theology. Unitarian Universalism, which grew out of the Protestant Reformation, is congruent with Omnism, and some congregations in the Unitarian Universalist Association explicitly attest to the category of Omnism. Other notable interfaith organizations include the Church for the Fellowship of All Peoples and The Parliament of the World's Religions was the first organization with the goal to unite all religions.

== Notable omnists ==
- Philip James Bailey, who first coined the term.
- Ramakrishna, the Hindu mystic, believed in all religions being true. His parable-based teachings advocated the essential unity of religions and proclaimed that world religions are "so many paths to reach one and the same goal".

== See also ==
- Bahá'í Faith
- Blind men and an elephant
- Religious pluralism
- Syncretism
- Universalism

== General and cited references ==
- Thomas P. Power (February 20, 2017). "6 Omnism". Confronting the Idols of Our Age. Wycliffe Studies in Gospel, Church, and Culture. Wipf and Stock. p. 30. ISBN 978-1532604331.
