= All Religions are One =

Series of philosophical aphorisms by William Blake

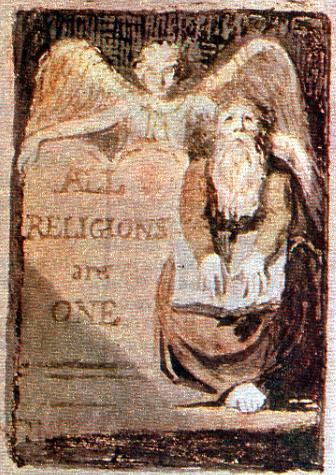
One of two known impressions of the title page from All Religions are One, printed c. 1795

All Religions are One is a series of philosophical aphorisms by William Blake, written in 1788. Following on from his initial experiments with relief etching in the non-textual The Approach of Doom (1787), All Religions are One and There is No Natural Religion represent Blake's first successful attempt to combine image and text via relief etching, and are thus the earliest of his illuminated manuscripts. As such, they serve as a significant milestone in Blake's career; as Peter Ackroyd points out, "his newly invented form now changed the nature of his expression. It had enlarged his range; with relief etching, the words inscribed like those of God upon the tables of law, Blake could acquire a new role."

== Relief etching ==
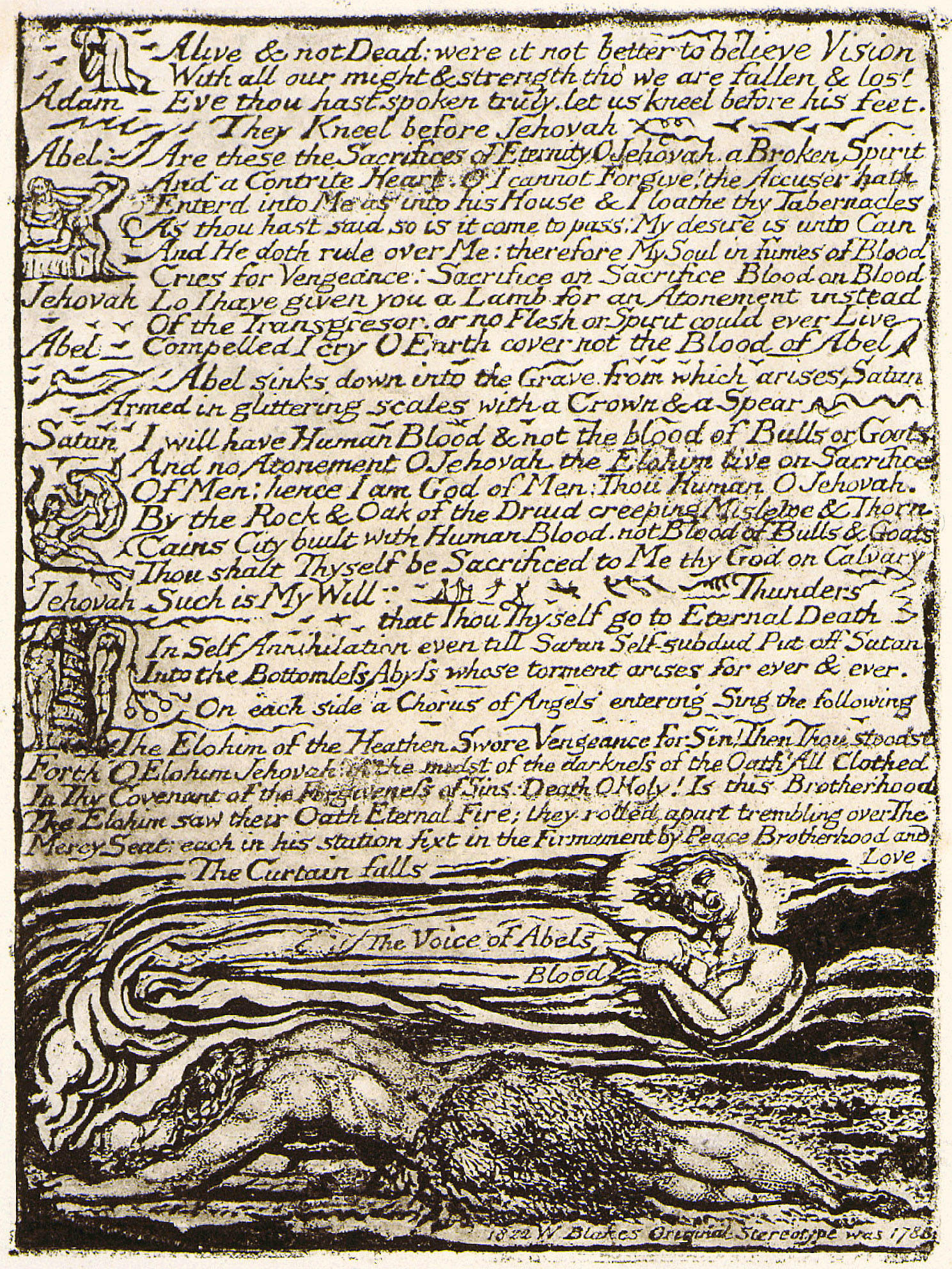
Page 2 of The Ghost of Abel (1822); note the writing in the colophon at bottom right.

In 1822, Blake completed a short two-page dramatic piece which would prove to be the last of his illuminated manuscripts, entitled The Ghost of Abel A Revelation in the Visions of Jehovah Seen by William Blake. Inscribed in the colophon of this text is "W Blakes Original Stereotype was 1788". It is almost universally agreed amongst Blakean scholars, that the "Original Stereotype" to which he here refers was All Religions are One and/or There is No Natural Religion.

During the 1770s, Blake had come to feel that one of the major problems with reproducing artwork in print was the division of labour by which it was achieved; one person would create a design (the artist), another would engrave it (the engraver), another print it (the printer) and another publish it (the publisher). It was unusual for artists to engrave their own designs, due primarily to the social status attached to each job; engraving was not seen as an especially exalted profession, and was instead regarded as nothing more than mechanical reproduction. Artists like James Barry and John Hamilton Mortimer were the exceptions to the norm insofar as they tended to engrave their own material. A further division in the process was that text and images were handled by different artisans; text was printed by means of a movable letterpress, whereas images were engraved, two very different jobs.

During Blake's training as a professional copy engraver with James Basire during the 1770s, the most common method of engraving was stippling, which was thought to give a more accurate impression of the original picture than the previously dominant method, line engraving. Etching was also commonly used for layering in such aspects as landscape and background. All traditional methods of engraving and etching were intaglio, which meant that the design's outline was traced with a needle through an acid-resistant 'ground' which had been poured over the copperplate. The plate was then covered with acid, and the engraver went over the incised lines with a burin to allow the acid to bite into the furrows and eat into the copper itself. The acid would then be poured off, leaving the design incised on the plate. The engraver would then engrave the plate's entire surface with a web of crosshatched lines, before pouring the ink onto the plate and transferring it to the printing press.

Frustrated with this method, Blake seems to have begun thinking about a new method of publishing at least as early as 1784, as in that year a rough description of what would become relief etching appears in his unpublished satire, An Island in the Moon. Around the same time, George Cumberland had been experimenting with a method to allow him to reproduce handwriting via an etched plate, and Blake incorporated Cumberland's method into his own relief etching; treating the text as handwritten script rather than mechanical letterpress, and thus allowing him to make it a component of the image.

Blake's great innovation in relief etching was to print from the relief, or raised, parts of the plate rather than the intaglio, or incised, parts. Whereas intaglio methods worked by creating furrows into which the acid was poured to create 'holes' in the plate and the ink then poured over the entire surface, Blake wrote and drew directly onto the plate with an acid-resistant material known as a stop-out. He would then embed the plate's edges in strips of wax to create a self-contained tray and pour the acid about a quarter of an inch deep, thus causing the exposed parts of the plate to melt away, and the design and/or text to remain slightly above the rest of the plate, i.e. in relief, like a modern rubber stamp. The acid was then poured off, the wax was removed, and the raised part of the plate was covered with ink before finally being pressed onto the paper in the printing press. This method allowed expressive effects which were impossible to achieve via intaglio. The major disadvantage was that text had to be written backwards as whatever was on the plate would print in reverse when pressed onto the paper. The dominant theory as to how Blake solved this problem is simply that he wrote in reverse. Another theory, suggested by David Bindman, is that Blake wrote his (acid-resistant) text on a sheet of paper the correct way around, and then pressed the paper onto the plate, thus reversing the text and producing the same result as if had he written it backwards in the first place.

Blake could also colour the plates themselves in coloured inks before pressing them or tint them with watercolours after printing. Because of this aspect, a major component of relief etching was that every page of every book was a unique piece of art; no two copies of any page in Blake's entire oeuvre are identical. Variations in the actual print, different colouring choices, repainted plates, accidents during the acid bath etc., all led to multiple examples of the same plate.

Blake himself referred to relief etching as "printing in the infernal method, by means of corrosives [...] melting apparent surfaces away, and displaying the infinite which was hid." A contemporary description of the method was provided by Blake's friend, J.T. Smith; "writing his poetry, and drawing his marginal subjects of embellishments in outline upon the copper-plate with an impervious liquid, and then eating the plain parts or lights away with aquafortis considerably below them so that the outlines were left as Stereotype."

Relief etching was the same basic method used for woodcutting, and copper relief etching had been practised in the early eighteenth century by Elisha Kirkall, but Blake was the first to use such a method to create both words and designs mixed together on the same plate. Apart from the unique aesthetic effects possible, a major advantage of relief etching was that Blake could print the material himself. Because the text was in relief, the pressure needed for printing was constant, unlike in intaglio printing, where different pressures were needed to force the paper into the furrows, depending on size. Additionally, intaglio etchings and engravings were printed with great pressure, but in relief etching, because the printed material was a raised surface rather than incised lines, considerably less pressure was required. As such, relief etching tackled the problem of the division of labour of publishing. Blake's new method was autographic; "it permitted – indeed promoted – a seamless relationship between conception and execution rather than the usual divisions between invention and production embedded in eighteenth-century print technology, and its economic and social distinctions among authors, printers, artists and engravers. Like drawings and manuscripts, Blake's relief etchings were created by the direct and positive action of the author/artist's hand without intervening processes." Blake served as artist, engraver, printer and publisher.

== Copy ==
Although All Religions are One was etched in 1788, the only surviving copy (known as Copy A) was not printed until 1795; a large paper copy printed as part of a deluxe edition of Blake's collected illuminated manuscripts. Whether he had printed All Religions prior to 1795 is unknown. However, the fact that it is not mentioned in his 'To the Public' address of October 1793, where he listed all of his extant manuscripts up to that time except All Religions and No Natural Religion, would suggest he had not.

Copy A is located in The Huntington Library, except Plate 2 (title page), which exists in two impressions. The copy of the title page which goes with Copy A is located in the Geoffrey Keynes Collection in the Fitzwilliam Museum. The title page from another copy (colour printed in brown ink), the additional plates of which are unrecorded, is in the Victoria and Albert Museum.

All Religions are One comprises ten plates, each of which is roughly 5.4 X 4 cm., with each paragraph on a separate plate, except Plate 10, which contains both Principal 7^{d} and a short paragraph which functions as a conclusion to the series. In numerous cases, it seems as if the acid has eaten away too much of the relief, and Blake has had to go over sections with ink and wash, often touching the text and design outlines with pen. Several of the plates also bear evidence of rudimentary colour printing, a method with which Blake was experimenting in the 1790s, and these plates may represent his first attempts at this technique (whereby he used coloured inks to print rather than black). Several of the plates also feature examples of white line engraving, a technique where Blake would literally cut into the stop-out to create tiny furrows, which would be eaten away by the acid, creating a streak effect in the final print.

The black ink framing lines drawn around each design are thought to have been added at a later date, possibly in 1818, just prior to Blake giving the plates to John Linnell. The ink and wash work in the designs themselves may also have been executed at that time, although this cannot be ascertained for certain. It has been suggested that the framing lines may have been added due to the discrepancy between the size of the plates and the size of the paper (each sheet is 37.8 x 27 cm.).

Plates 1 and 3–10 of the Huntington copy were acquired by John Linnell sometime after 1818, with the missing title page replaced by an impression of the title page from There is No Natural Religion. The plates were sold from the Linnell estate on 15 March 1918 to Henry E. Huntington. Plate 2 was acquired by George A. Smith in 1853. It may have subsequently been owned by William Muir but was ultimately sold at Sotheby's by Sir Hickman Bacon on 21 July 1953, to Geoffrey Keynes, who donated it to the Fitzwilliam Museum in 1982.

After the original 1795 printing, the text of All Religions was not published again until 1893, in The Works of William Blake, Poetic, Symbolic and Critical, edited by W.B. Yeats and E.J. Ellis.

== Dating ==
Until 1971, most editors tended to consider All Religions are One as later than There is No Natural Religion. For example, in his 1905 book The poetical works of William Blake; a new and verbatim text from the manuscript engraved and letterpress originals, John Sampson places No Natural Religion prior to All Religions in his "Appendix to the Prophetic Books". However, in 1971, Geoffrey Keynes argued that All Religions are One was the earlier of the two, based on what he saw as its "greater technical imperfection." In his 1978 book, The Complete Graphic Works of William Blake, David Bindman initially disagreed with Keynes, arguing that the imperfections in All Religions are not because of an earlier date of composition, but because of the increased complexity of the plates, with such complexity demonstrating Blake growing in confidence from the more rudimentary plates for No Natural Religion. Most scholars however support Keynes, and All Religions are One precedes There is No Natural Religion in almost all modern anthologies of Blake's work; for example, Alicia Ostriker's William Blake: The Complete Poems (1977), David V. Erdman's 2nd edition of The Complete Poetry and Prose of William Blake (1982), Morris Eaves', Robert N. Essick's and Joseph Viscomi's Blake's Illuminated Books, Volume 3: The Early Illuminated Books (1993), even Bindman's own The Complete Illuminated Books of William Blake (2003), and W.H. Stevenson's 3rd edition of Blake: The Complete Poems (2007).

Further evidence for Keynes's hypothesis is discussed by Eaves, Essick and Viscomi, who, in counterpoint to Bindman, see the style of No Natural Religion as more confident than that of All Religions. They especially cite the use of upright roman lettering in All Religions contrasted with the italic, cursive writing on several plates of No Natural Religion; "this style was easier to execute since it required fewer independent strokes. And since the resulting dense matrix of lines provided better support for the inking dabber, italic permitted a shallower etch." Blake introduced italic script on plate a3 of No Natural Religion, a script which he would use throughout the 1790s. Other evidence for an earlier dating of All Religions is that many of the individual letters themselves lean to the left, unlike in No Natural Religion. This was a common problem in mirror writing, and its presence in All Religions but not No Natural Religion suggests Blake was only learning how to overcome it as he worked.

== Content ==
When analysing All Religions are One it is important to remember that the images are not necessarily literal depictions of the text; "the philosophical propositions [...] offer little visual imagery or even named objects. These qualities may have determined the relative independence of many of the designs from the accompanying text. The links are thematic and metaphoric, not direct and literal."

Number	Image	Text	Description	Notes
Plate 1 (frontispiece)		The Voice of one crying in the Wilderness	Non-descript vegetation surrounds the text on both sides and on the bottom. In the main image, a male, naked from the waist up, sits on a large stone and points to the right. The background is filled with tree trunks and leaves.	The phrase "the voice of one crying in the wilderness" is from the Bible, where it occurs in each of the four New Testament gospels; Matthew, 3:3; Mark, 1:3; Luke, 3:4; and John 1:23. In all four gospels, the phrase is used by Isaiah to describe John the Baptist, thus suggesting that John may be the figure in the picture, preaching in the wilderness represented by the foliage and tree trunks. It was common for texts in the late eighteenth century to have a frontispiece portrait of the author, so by depicting John the Baptist instead of himself, Blake indicates that he sees himself following in the prophetic tradition of John, and as such, "the wilderness becomes a metaphor for the false philosophies Blake argues against."
Plate 2 (title page)		ALL; RELIGIONS are ONE	The image depicts an old man, his hands resting on an open book. Behind him and to the left is an angel, his left hand resting on the old man's shoulder. The angel's right hand is resting on a large tablet with a double-arched top, bearing the title "ALL RELIGIONS are ONE," the words diegetically inscribed on the tablet.	Due to the double-arched top, the tablet is reminiscent of the two stone tablets of the decalogue, and as such, the old man may be an Old Testament prophet. If the tablets do represent the decalogue, it is significant that Blake's title has supplanted the text. Blake would go on to criticise the ten commandments in later work such as The Marriage of Heaven and Hell (1790), The Book of Urizen (1794), The Book of Los (1795) and The Song of Los (1795), and that same critical inclination seems present here as he quite literally effaces the content of the original tablets, replacing it with his own doctrine. However, it is also worth noting that the angel embraces the man with his left hand and the tablets with his right, thus suggesting a spiritual union between the man of prophecy (Blake himself) and the foundational text of orthodox Christianity.
Plate 3 (Argument)		The Argument As the true meth- -od of knowledge is experiment the true faculty of knowing must be the faculty which experiences, This faculty I treat of.	At the top of the plate, vines surround "The Argument". In the main image, a male lies on the ground, his head propped on his right hand. Grass grows at his feet and behind the grass may be the base of a hill or cliff.	The posture of the figure is indicative of traditional melancholy. The text seems to be a declaration of the tenets of Empiricism as advocated by John Locke, Isaac Newton and, especially, Francis Bacon. In 1808, Blake annotated Volume 1 of The Works of Sir Joshua Reynolds, edited by Edmond Malone, and wrote "Bacon says that everything must be done by experiment."
Plate 4 (Principle 1st)		PRINCIPLE 1st That the Poetic Genius is the true Man. and that the body or outward form of Man is derived from the Poetic Genius. Likewise that the forms of all things are derived from their Genius. which by the Ancients was call'd an Angel & Spirit & Demon	A vine runs along the bottom of the plate, below the text. Above the text, an old man sits among clouds, his arms stretched out to the left and right, each hand resting on a cloud.	As this is the plate where Blake first introduces the notion of the "Poetic Genius", the figure in the clouds could be a personification of that notion. David Bindman interprets him as "the human form or spirit or demon of the cloud." Thematically, this plate undercuts the pseudo-empiricist declaration of the previous plate, suggesting that the external form of Man actually originates from the internal Poetic Genius, not from sensate experiences. The clouds on this plate have been created via white line etching.
Plate 5 (Principle 2^{d})		PRINCIPLE 2^{d} As all men are alike in outward form, So (and with the same infinite variety) all are alike in the Poetic Genius	Below the text, a flock of sheep can be seen grazing. On the right side of the text stands a small palm tree. On the left, a much larger palm tree stretches to the top of the plate and spreads its branches around two figures, both seemingly naked, lying side by side on the ground.	Due to the posture, it is possible that the figure in the background is in the process of emerging from within the figure in the foreground, and if so, the image could be a metaphorical depiction of the birth of Eve from Adam's rib, as described in the Book of Genesis, 2:21–22. Bindman also interprets the people as Adam and Eve, and argues that the sheep at the bottom of the plate illustrate the claim that "all are alike", and Adam and Eve illustrate the "infinite variety." Similarly, if the image does depict Eve emerging from Adam, it is thematically relatable to All Religions as a whole; "a picture of the original human 'outward form' is an appropriate illustration for a work stressing the oneness of all forms, physical and religious, that have a common origin." Robert N. Essick speculates that the palm tree, as a "traditional symbol of immortality and resiliency, may [...] symbolise the continual renewal of the same basic forms of nature."
Plate 6 (Principle 3^{d})		PRINCIPLE 3^{d} No man can think write or speak from his heart but he must intend truth. Thus all sects of Philosophy are from the Poetic Genius adapted to the weaknesses of every individual	At the bottom of the text, the last letter of "every" in the last line extends into the lower margin as a vine. Along the right margin is another vine extending into a flower. The main image depicts an old man in a chair, writing in a book on his lap. Behind him sits another man. He too has a book on his lap, from which he is reading.	The two men may depict the "sects of philosophy" mentioned in the text. If the objects on the left are columns, the picture may depict Ancient Greece or Rome, which is also hinted at by the chairs' arched backs, and as such, the image depicts the foundations of ancient philosophy. The backs of the chairs have been created via white line etching.
Plate 7 (Principle 4.)		PRINCIPLE 4. As none by trave ling over known lands can find out the unknown. So from already ac- -quired knowledge Man could not ac quire more. there fore an universal Poetic Genius exists	Vines grow above, below and to the left of the text. In the main picture at the top of the plate, a man is walking to the right, holding a walking-stick in his hand.	Eaves, Essick and Viscomi argue that Blake may have been inspired in this principle by Samuel Taylor Coleridge's Biographia Literaria in which Coleridge argued against the associationism of David Hartley and for the primacy of the Imagination. The man in the image probably depicts the traveller mentioned in the text, passing through "known lands". Peter Ackroyd suggests that the man may be Blake himself, attempting to travel through the worn-out land of contemporary philosophical and theological thought. Blake would use this same image on Plate 14 of For Children: The Gates of Paradise' (1793). The hills in the background have been composed via white line etching.
Plate 8 (Principle, 5)		PRINCIPLE, 5 The Religions of all Nati- -ons are derived from each Nations different reception of the Poetic Genius which is every where call'd the Spi -rit of Prophecy	Vines divide the heading and the first line of text, and extend from the last line into the image below. Above the heading, a group of small figures, probably children, look toward a much larger figure in a chair on the right. Probably male, the figure leans towards the children. They appear to be inside a large tent. Below the text, a naked male moves to the left, although he seems to be looking upwards. He is holding a large harp.	The image of the children is probably a depiction of religious instruction, hence the imparting of the knowledge of "the Religions of all Nations". The figure below the text could be a bard, who would thus represent "the Spirit of Prophecy". Bindman speculates that he may represent "a unity of time and space." The phrase "the Spirit of Prophecy" is from the Book of Revelation, 19:10, where the spirit is equated with the testimony of Christ; "I fell at his feet to worship him. But he said to me, "Do not do it! I am a fellow servant with you and with your brothers who hold to the testimony of Jesus. Worship God! For the testimony of Jesus is the spirit of prophecy"." As such, Blake equates the Poetic Genius with the Spirit of Prophecy, thus lending an ancient biblical credence to his theory; the Poetic Genius is in fact the testimony of Jesus.
Plate 9 (Principle, 6)		PRINCIPLE, 6 The Jewish & Chris- tian Testaments are An original derivati- -on from the Poetic Ge- nius. this is necessary from the confined natu re of bodily sensation	Above the text, are two stone tablets with an unreadable inscription on each one. Below the text, a figure (who could be male or female) in a long gown walks to the right. The scene appears to be at night.	The tablets probably represent the "Jewish & Christian Testaments" mentioned in the text. The figure may be a personification of the "confined nature of bodily sensation." Thematically, Blake is arguing for the divine authority of the Bible as an original manifestation of the Poetic Genius; "any such authority resides in the Testaments, because of their original inspiration, and not in institutional religions that claim to be based on them. In Blake's view, such religions distorted and manipulated original meanings for the purpose of subjugation." Blake would return to the concept of organised religion corrupting the original Biblical messages in The Marriage of Heaven and Hell (1790), Europe a Prophecy (1794), The Book of Urizen (1794) and The Song of Los (1795). Eaves, Essick and Viscomi see the designs "as a repetition of the distinction between inspired testaments and sense experience set forth in the text, but the tablets and their enclosure also suggest the codification of 'Poetic Genius' into repressive laws of institutional religion." The darkness has been composed via white line etching.
Plate 10 (Principle 7^{d})		PRINCIPLE 7^{d} As all men are alike (tho' infintiely vari- ous) So all Religions & as all similars have one source The true Man is the source he being the Poetic Genius	Above the text is a male figure, pictured from the chest up with his arms raised. Below him on the left is a figure lying on the ground with his upper body raised slightly. Below on the right is another figure lying on the ground, his upper body twisted away from the central figure and his arms reaching to the right. Below the text, a bird flies over dark water.	The figure at the top of the image may be Christ, and the scene depicted could be that of Christ rising from the tomb and startling two sentries, as described in Matthew 28:4. It is also possible that the two figures are Adam and Eve, and the figure above is God, separating them. The bird may be the dove of the Holy Spirit moving "upon the face of the waters" (Genesis 1:2). The sea has been composed via white line etching.
Alternatively coloured title page				An alternative version of the title page from an otherwise unknown copy, colour printed in brown ink. The shadow across the tablets was created with wash after the print. Now located in the Victoria and Albert Museum.

== Interpretation ==
The central concern in All Religions are One is the notion of the "Poetic Genius", which is roughly analogous to the imagination. Blake argues that the Poetic Genius is greater than all else and "is the true man." The Poetic Genius thus replaces traditional concepts of divinity insofar as "The body or outward form of Man is derived from the Poetic Genius [...] the forms of all things are derived from their Genius. which by the Ancients was call'd an Angel & Spirit & Demon." Thus, the Poetic Genius supplants theological belief. This Poetic Genius is universal, common to all Mankind; "as all men are alike in outward form [...] all men are alike in the Poetic Genius." Similarly, all philosophies are derived from the Poetic Genius; "all sects of Philosophies are from the Poetic Genius adapted to the weaknesses of every individual", and so too are all religions, which are merely expressions of the Poetic Genius; "the Religions of all Nations are derived from each Nations different reception of the Poetic Genius which is everywhere call'd the Spirit of Prophecy," again emphasising the theological character of the Poetic Genius. Even the Bible originates with the Poetic Genius; "The Jewish & Christian Testaments are An original derivation from the Poetic Genius." Thus, as all Men are alike in their Poetic Genius, and as all religions originate with the Poetic Genius, so too must all religions be alike, thus all religions are one.

David Bindman classifies All Religions are One as "a rather abstract dialogue with conventional theology," and in this sense, it is often interpreted as Blake's earliest engagement with deism and dualism. Similarly, Northrop Frye argues that Blake's theory that all religions are one is a "visionary tolerance" at odds with the "rational tolerance" of deism "which holds that all religions are equally an attempt to solve an insoluble mystery." Working along the same lines, Florence Sandler argues that in these texts Blake "set himself to the task of separating true religion from its perversions in his own age and in the Bible itself." Also concentrating on the refutation of deism, Alicia Ostriker refers to the series as a "mockery of rationalism and an insistence on Man's potential infinitude." S. Foster Damon suggests that what Blake has done in All Religions are One is "dethroned reason from its ancient place as the supreme faculty of man, replacing it with the Imagination." Damon also argues that "Blake had completed his revolutionary theory of the nature of Man and proclaimed the unity of all true religions." Harold Bloom reaches much the same conclusion, suggesting that Blake is arguing for the "primacy of the poetic imagination over all metaphysical and moral systems." A similar conclusion is reached by Denise Vultee, who argues that "the two tractates are part of Blake's lifelong quarrel with the philosophy of Bacon, Newton, and Locke. Rejecting the rational empiricism of eighteenth-century deism or "natural religion", which looked to the material world for evidence of God's existence, Blake offers as an alternative the imaginative faculty or "Poetic Genius"."

In terms of influences on Blake, in 1787 Henry Fuseli was working on a translation of J.C. Lavater's Aphorisms on Man for the publisher Joseph Johnson, when he hired Blake to engrave the frontispiece. Blake became so enamoured of Lavater's work that on the inside cover of his own copy of the book, he inscribed both his name and Lavater's, and drew a heart encompassing them. Blake also extensively annotated his own copy of Aphorisms, and a number of critics have noted parallels between the Lavater annotations and Blake's own aphorisms in both All Religions and No Natural Religion. S. Foster Damon specifically points to Lavater's first two aphorisms as having a strong influence on Blake;

1. Know, in the first place, that mankind agree in essence, as they do in their limbs and senses.
2. Mankind differ as much in essence as they do in form, limbs, and senses – and only so, and not more".

To these points, Blake has annotated "This is true Christian philosophy far above all abstraction."

Another work which may also have influenced him is Emanuel Swedenborg's Heaven and Hell (1758). In his annotations to Swedenborg, Blake twice connects the word "Lord" with "Poetic Genius". During Swedenborg's discussion of the connection between the spiritual world and the natural world, Blake writes "He who Loves feels love descend into him & if he has wisdom may perceive it is from the Poetic Genius which is the Lord." Shortly thereafter, to Swedenborg's "the negation of God constitutes Hell", Blake annotates "the negation of the Poetic Genius."

While the Lavater and Swedenborg influences are somewhat speculative, the importance of Bacon, Newton and Locke is not, as it is known that Blake despised empiricism from an early age. In 1808, as he annotated The Works of Sir Joshua Reynolds, Blake wrote,

Burke's Treatise on the Sublime & Beautiful is founded on the Opinions of Newton & Locke on this Treatise Reynolds has grounded many of his assertions. in all his Discourses I read Burkes Treatise when very Young at the same time I read Locke on Human Understanding & Bacons Advancement of Learning on Every one of these Books I wrote my Opinions & on looking them over find that my Notes on Reynolds in this Book are exactly Similar. I felt the Same Contempt & Abhorrence then; that I do now. They mock Inspiration & Vision Inspiration & Vision was then & now is & I hope will always Remain my Element my Eternal Dwelling place. how can I then hear it Contemnd without returning Scorn for Scorn

Harold Bloom also cites the work of Anthony Collins, Matthew Tindal and John Toland as having an influence on Blake's thoughts. In a more general sense, "Blake sees the school of Bacon and Locke as the foundation of natural religion, the deistic attempt to prove the existence of God on the basis of sensate experience and its rational investigation." To that end, Blake "manipulates the syncretic mythology of Jacob Bryant, Paul Henri Mallet, and perhaps other founders of what has become the comparative study of religion, to argue for the existence of a universal and supra-rational 'Poetic Genius' that expresses itself through the shared (though ever various) forms of all religions."

In relation to his later work, Northrop Frye sees All Religions are One and There is No Natural Religion as forming a fundamental statement of intent for Blake, a kind of pre-emptive outline of his future work, "a summarised statement of the doctrines of the engraved canon." Similarly, Eaves, Essick and Viscomi state that they "contain some of Blake's most fundamental principles and reveal the foundation for later development in his thought and art." W.H. Stevenson calls them "a very early statement of fundamental opinions [Blake] held all his life." As an example of how Blake returned to the specific themes of All Religions, in The Marriage of Heaven and Hell (1790), he writes "the Poetic Genius was the first principle and all the others merely derivative" (12:22–24).
