= Ardagh =

Ardagh (Ardachadh or Ard-achadh, meaning "high field" in Irish; modern Irish: Ardach) may refer to:

== Places on the island of Ireland ==
- Ardagh, County Antrim, a townland
- Ardagh, County Cork, a townland; see List of townlands of the barony of Bear
- Ardagh, County Donegal, a townland
- Ardagh, County Limerick, a village and parish
- Ardagh, County Londonderry, a townland; see List of townlands of County Londonderry
- Ardagh, County Longford, a village
  - Ardagh (barony), containing the village
- Ardagh, County Mayo, a parish and townland
- Ardagh, County Sligo; see List of townlands of County Sligo

== Other uses ==
- Ardagh (surname), with a list of people with this surname
- Ardagh GAA, Gaelic football club in County Mayo, Ireland
- Ardagh Group, based in Luxembourg, produces metal and glass packaging
- Ardagh railway station, served the Limerick village

=== Dioceses ===
- Diocese of Kilmore, Elphin and Ardagh, in the Church of Ireland province of Armagh
- Roman Catholic Diocese of Ardagh and Clonmacnoise, in the province of Armagh, Ireland

== See also ==
- Ardagh Castle Cheese, a small cheese producer in Ireland
- Ardagh–Johnson Line, a boundary of Kashmir determined by the British
- Ardagh Fort, ancient rath near the Limerick village
- Ardagh Hoard, that includes the Ardagh Chalice, from the fort
