= Christianity not Mysterious =

1696 book by John Toland

- Author: John Toland
- Language: English
- Subject: Christianity
- Published: 1696
- Media type: Print
- ISBN: 978-1230366722

Christianity not Mysterious is a 1696 book by the radical thinker John Toland.

== Publication history ==
The work was published anonymously between December 1695 and June 1696. Toland admitted his authorship in June 1696.

== Influence ==
Christianity not Mysterious is a seminal work in both freethought and Irish philosophy.
