= Osmond Ardagh =

English cricketer (1900–1954)

Personal information
- Full name: Osmond Charles Ardagh
- Born: 1 November 1900; Haslemere, England
- Died: 1 February 1954 (aged 53); Berkshire, England
- Batting: Left-handed

Domestic team information
- Years: Team
- 1922: Oxford University
- Only FC: 24 June 1922 Oxford Univ. v Leicestershire

Career statistics
Competition	First-class
Matches	1
Runs scored	2
Batting average	2.00
100s/50s	0/0
Top score	2
Catches/stumpings	0/–
- Source: CricketArchive, 17 January 2009

Osmond Charles Ardagh (1 November 1900 – 1 February 1954) was an English first-class cricketer who played a single match for Oxford University in 1922. He was born at Haslemere, Surrey and was found drowned in the river Thames at Wallingford, then in Berkshire.

== Cricket career ==
In his single first-class cricket appearance, he opened the batting in the match against Leicestershire and scored just two runs. He also played a few matches for Surrey's second eleven in the Minor Counties in 1920 and 1922.

== Personal life ==
In 1925, when his forthcoming marriage to Margot Irene Biheller was announced in The Times, he was credited as "of the Nyasaland Government Service". When she died in 1969, The Times recorded that they had had two sons, John and Hugh. His son John Ardagh was a noted journalist and writer on contemporary France. His grandson Arjuna Ardagh is a writer, and the founder of Awakening Coaching.
