= Ardoch =

Ardoch can refer to:

- Ardoch, Perth and Kinross, Scotland
- Ardoch, North Dakota, USA
- Ardoch, a community within North Frontenac, Ontario, Canada
- Ardoch Algonquin First Nation, Ontario, Canada
- Ardoch Burn, stream in Scotland
- Ardoch National Wildlife Refuge, North Dakota, USA
- Ardoch Roman Fort, Scotland
