= John Ardagh =

British journalist, writer and broadcaster

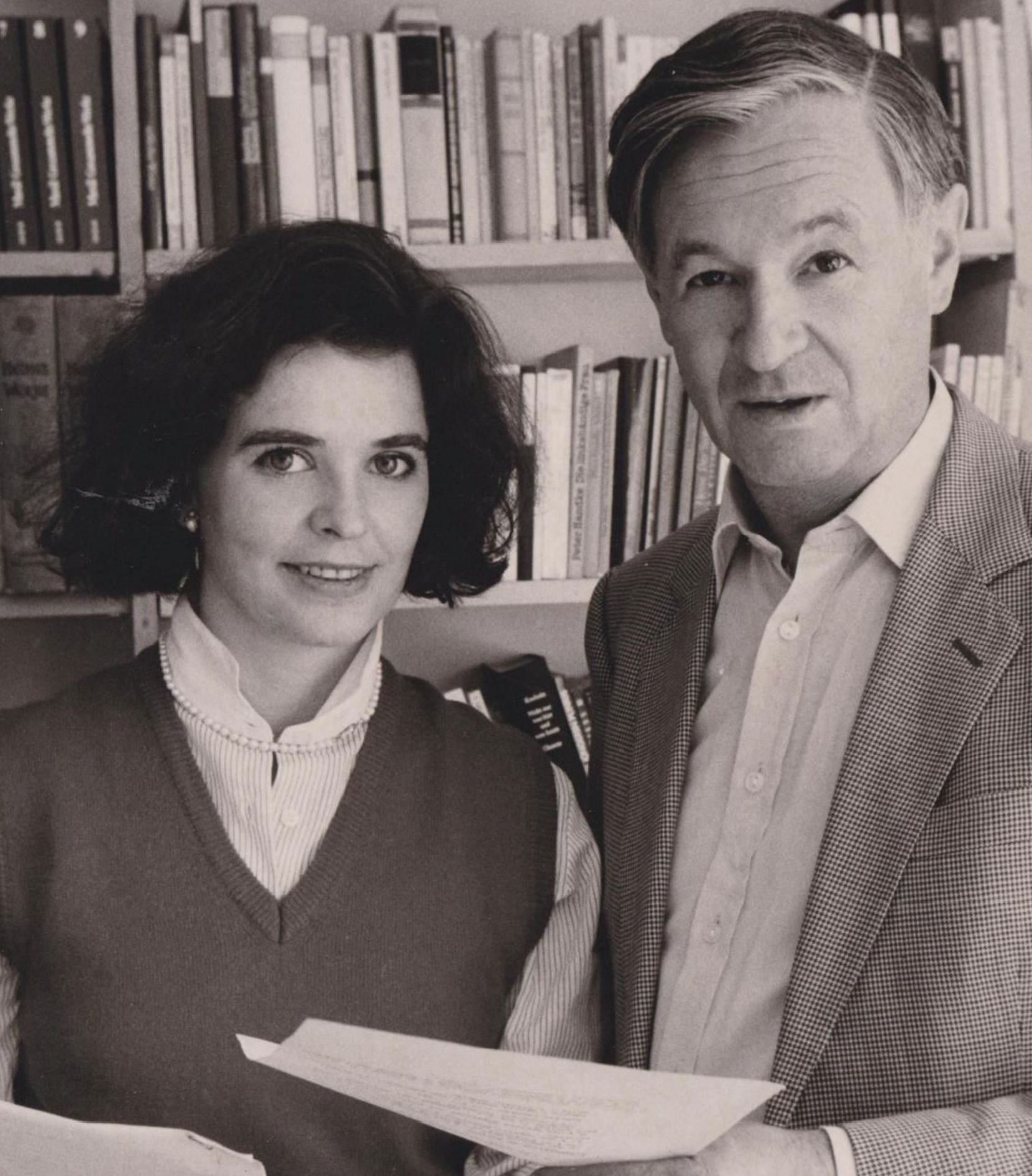
John Ardagh and his wife Katharina

John Ardagh (28 May 1928, Nyasaland – 26 January 2008, London) was a British journalist, writer and broadcaster. He was educated at Sherborne School, Dorset, and Worcester College, Oxford, where he studied classics and philosophy. From 1953 until 1959, he was a staff writer and correspondent for The Times in France and Algeria. His interest in provincial themes developed through work for Independent Television News and as a correspondent for The Observer (1960–66), mainly writing about culture. His book The New French Revolution, first published in 1968, has been updated many times, most recently as France in the New Century: Portrait of a Changing Society (1999) Ardagh wrote other books to reflect "real" life in Europe. Tale of Five Cities, based on major provincial centers of Europe, appeared in 1979. Germany and the Germans he wrote in 1987, together with his German wife, Katharina. Ireland and the Irish (1994) drew on his family roots. He was also managing editor of the Good Food Guide from 1966 to 1968 and European editor of the Good Hotel Guide for 25 years. Ardagh continued to work for better cross-Channel understanding as a member of the Franco-British Council (1992–98). His name is associated with a study of publishing in France and Britain (1995), produced with the French historian, François Crouzet. The French Government made him a Chevalier des Arts et des Lettres

His explorer roots went back to his childhood. His father, Osmond Ardagh, was a colonial administrator and played first-class cricket for Oxford University. His mother was Austrian. He was married four times, showing his “cosmopolitan streak in his choice of wives: English, Czech (rescued from the Prague Spring of 1968), Australian and German”(Katharina, born Schmitz, *1951 in Berlin). His son from the first marriage is the author and speaker (Nicholas) Arjuna Ardagh.

== Books Authored ==
- Ardagh, John (1999). France in the New Century: Portrait of a Changing Society. Viking. ISBN 0670883603. (and previous editions)
- Ardagh, John (1995). Germany and the Germans: The United Germany in the Mid-1990s. Penguin. ISBN 0140252665. (and previous editions)
- Ardagh, John (1995). Ireland and the Irish: Portrait of a Changing Society. Penguin. ISBN 0140171606.
- Ardagh, John (1979). Tale of Five Cities: Life in Provincial Europe Today (Stuttgart, Bologna, Newcastle-upon-Tyne, Toulouse, Ljubljana). Secker & Warburg. ISBN 0436017482.
