= Ardagh, County Donegal =

Coordinates: 55°17′18″N 7°23′29″W

- Townland
- Interactive map of Ardagh, County Donegal
- Country: Ireland

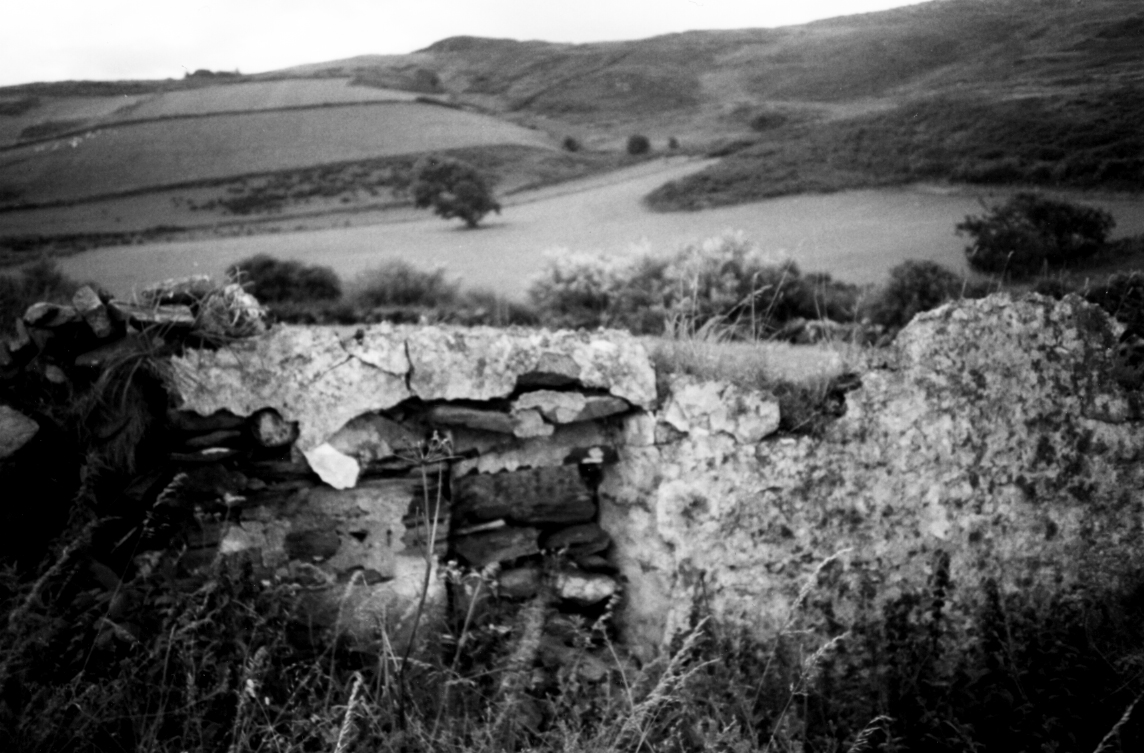
Part of the wall, ruined house at Ardagh

Ardagh (Irish: Ardachadh, meaning 'high field') is a townland in the fertile district known as the Laggan in East Donegal, part of County Donegal, Ireland. It is very near St Johnston. It became part of the large Abercorn Estate and was settled by mainly Lowland Scots settlers during the Plantation of Ulster.

== People ==
- John Toland, Irish philosopher

== See also ==
- List of towns and villages in Ireland
