= John Toland =

Irish Enlightenment Philosopher (1670-1722)

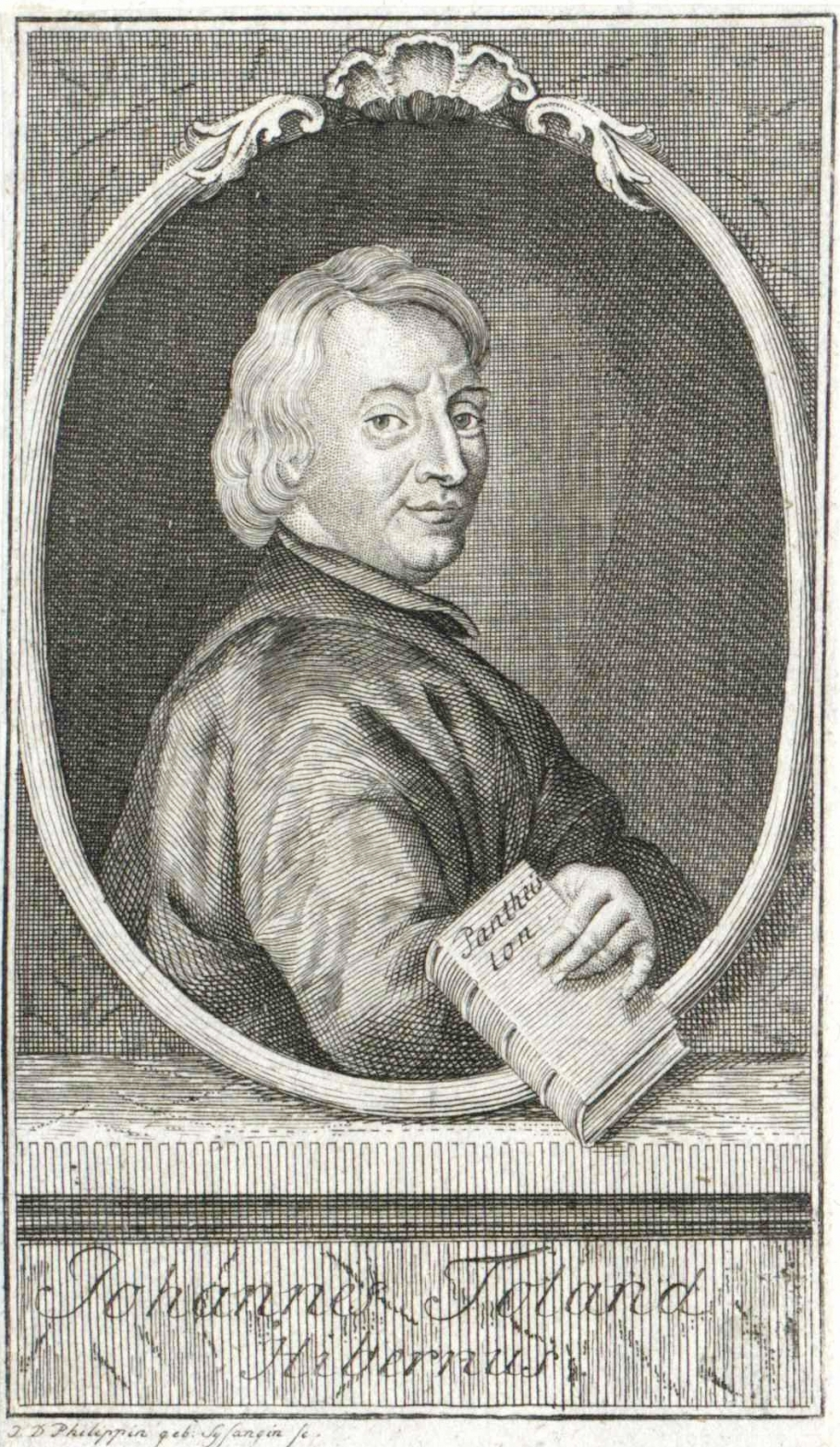
- The only known image of Toland holding a copy of Pantheisticon
- Born: 30 November 1670; Ardagh, County Donegal, Ireland
- Died: 11 March 1722 (aged 51); Putney, Surrey, England
- Other names: Janus Junius Toland, Seán Ó Tuathaláin, Eoghan na leabhar (John of the books)

Philosophical work
- Era: Age of Enlightenment
- Region: Western philosophy
- Main interests: Liberty, theology, physics
- Notable ideas: Pantheism

John Toland (30 November 1670 – 11 March 1722) was an Irish rationalist philosopher and freethinker, and occasional satirist, who wrote numerous books and pamphlets on political philosophy and philosophy of religion, which are early expressions of the philosophy of the Age of Enlightenment. Born in Ireland, he was educated at the universities of Glasgow, Edinburgh, Leiden and Oxford and was influenced by the philosophy of John Locke.

His first, and best known work, Christianity Not Mysterious (1696), opposed hierarchy in both church and state. In Ireland, copies were burned by the public hangman, and he was forced to flee the country never to return.

== Biography ==
Very little is known of Toland's early life. He was born in Ardagh on the Inishowen Peninsula, a predominantly Catholic and Irish-speaking region in northwestern Ireland. His parents are unknown. He would later write that he had been baptised Janus Junius, a play on his name that recalled both the Roman two-faced god Janus and Junius Brutus, reputed founder of the Roman Republic. According to his biographer Pierre des Maizeaux, he adopted the name John as a schoolboy with the encouragement of his school teacher.

Having formally converted from Catholicism to Protestantism (Anglicanism) at the age of 16, Toland got a scholarship to study theology at the University of Glasgow. In 1690, at age 19, the University of Edinburgh conferred a master's degree on him. He then got a scholarship to spend two years studying at University of Leiden in Holland, and subsequently nearly two years at Oxford in England (1694–95), where he acquired a reputation for great learning and "little religion." The Leiden scholarship had been provided by wealthy English Dissenters, who hoped Toland would go on to become a minister for Dissenters.

In Toland's first book Christianity not Mysterious (1696), begun at Oxford, he argued that the divine revelation of the Bible contains no true mysteries; rather, all the dogmas of the faith can be understood and demonstrated by properly trained reason from natural principles. His argument immediately attracted several rebuttals, and he was prosecuted by a grand jury in London. As he was a subject of the Kingdom of Ireland, members of the Parliament of Ireland proposed that he should be burnt at the stake, and in his absence—curtailing a visit in 1697, he fled the country—three copies of the book were burnt by the public hangman in Dublin as the content was contrary to the core doctrines of the Church of Ireland. Toland bitterly compared the Protestant legislators to "Popish Inquisitors who performed that Execution on the Book, when they could not seize the Author, whom they had destined to the Flames".

After his departure from Oxford Toland resided in London for most of the rest of his life. He was financially supported by other opposition Whigs such as Robert Molesworth and the Earl of Shaftesbury. He frequently visited the European continent, particularly Germany and the Netherlands, living on the Continent from 1707 to 1710.

Toland died in Putney on 10 March 1722. The Encyclopædia Britannica Eleventh Edition (1911) says of him that at his death in London at age 51 "he died... as he had lived, in great poverty, in the midst of his books, with his pen in his hand." Just before he died, he composed his own epitaph, part of which reads: "He was an assertor of liberty, a lover of all sorts of learning ... but no man's follower or dependent. Nor could frowns or fortune bend him to decline from the ways he had chosen." Although he himself had written biographies in his career, it concludes, tellingly: "If you would know more of him, search his writings."

Very shortly after his death a lengthy biography of Toland was written by Pierre des Maizeaux, a primary and authoritative source on his life.

== Political thought ==
John Toland was the first person called a freethinker (by Bishop Berkeley) and went on to write over a hundred books in various domains but mostly dedicated to criticising ecclesiastical institutions. A great deal of his intellectual activity was dedicated to writing political tracts in support of the Whig cause, particularly its Commonwealthmen faction. Many scholars know him for his role as either the biographer or editor of notable republicans from the mid-17th century such as James Harrington, Algernon Sidney and John Milton. His works Anglia Libera and State Anatomy are prosaic expressions of an English republicanism which reconciles itself with constitutional monarchy. During a brief visit to Hanover in 1701, he was received by the electress Sophia, as Anglia Libera contained a defence of the Hanoverian succession.

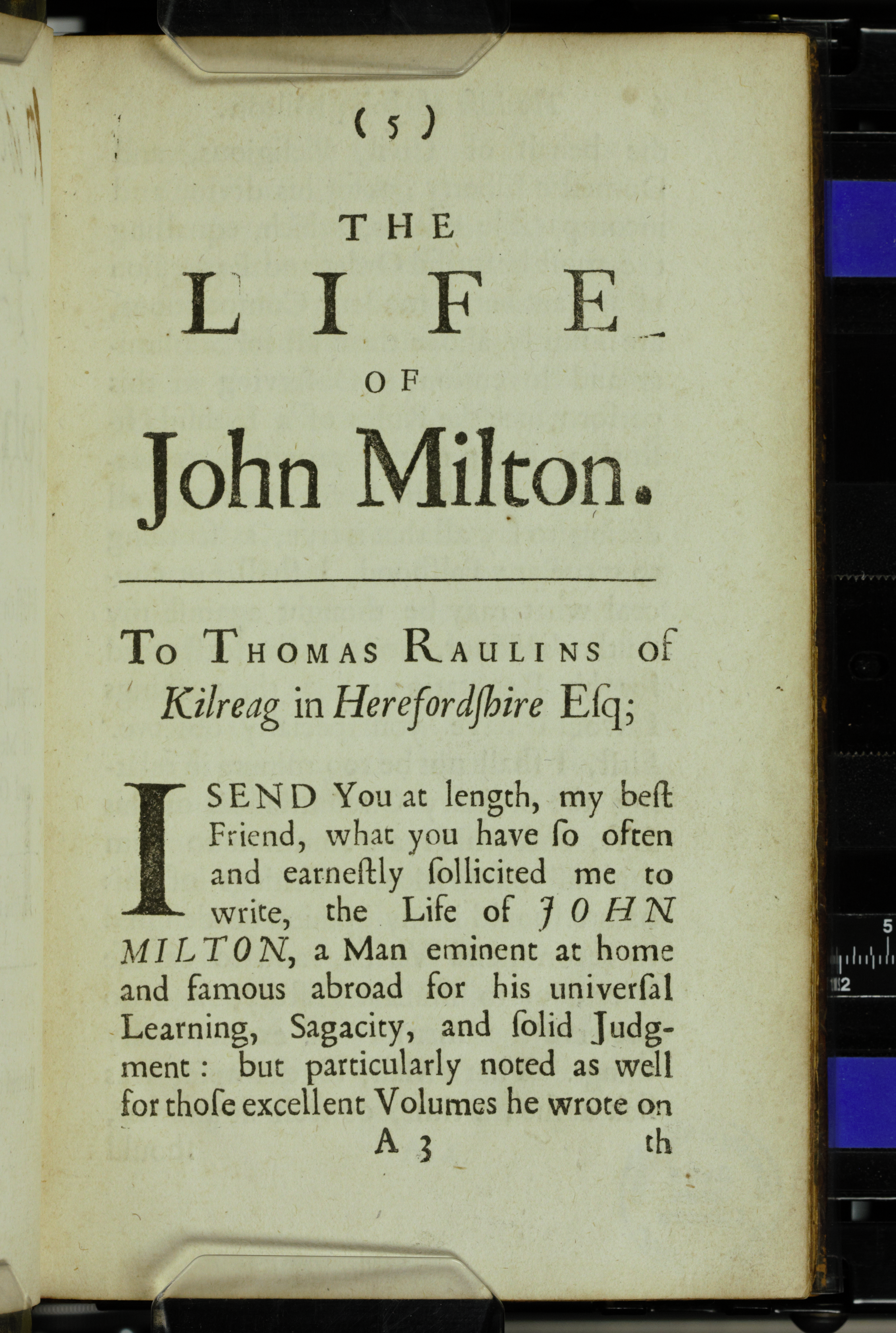
The first page of "The Life of John Milton", authored by Toland in 1699. Digitized by the University of Notre Dame Hesburgh Libraries.

After Christianity Not Mysterious, Toland's views became gradually more radical. His opposition to hierarchy in the church also led to opposition to hierarchy in the state; bishops and kings, in other words, were as bad as each other, and monarchy had no God-given sanction as a form of government. In his 1704 Letters to Serena—in which he used the expression "pantheism"—he carefully analysed the manner by which truth is arrived at, and why people are prone to forms of "false consciousness."

In politics his most radical proposition was that liberty was a defining characteristic of what it means to be human. Political institutions should be designed to guarantee freedom, not simply to establish order. For Toland, reason and tolerance were the twin pillars of the good society. This was Whiggism at its most intellectually refined, the very antithesis of the Tory belief in sacred authority in both church and state. Toland's belief in the need for perfect equality among free-born citizens was extended to the Jewish community, tolerated, but still outsiders in early 18th century England. In his 1714 work Reasons for Naturalising the Jews, he called for naturalizing foreign-born Jews and allowing them to hold public office. The work borrowed from Simone Luzzatto's 1638 Discourse on the Jews of Venice.

Toland's world was not all detached intellectual speculation, however. There was also an incendiary element to his political pamphleteering, and he was not beyond appealing to some of the baser anti-Catholic sentiments of the day in his attacks on the Jacobites.

=== Dissemination of "The Treatise of the Three Imposters" ===
Toland claimed to own a personal copy of the manuscript of the Treatise of the Three Impostors, in which Christianity, Judaism and Islam are all condemned as three great political frauds, which he passed to the circle of Jean Rousset in France. The Treatise of the Three Imposters was rumoured to exist in manuscript form since the Middle Ages and excoriated throughout all of Europe. It is now thought that the work did not exist.

Rumours that it was then translated into French were taken seriously by some: however, not by Voltaire, who issued a satirical reply.

=== Editions of republican radicals of the 1650s ===
His republican sympathies were also evidenced by his editing of the writings of some of the great radicals of the 1650s, including James Harrington, Algernon Sydney, Edmund Ludlow and John Milton. In his support for the Hanoverian monarchy he somewhat moderated his republican sentiments; though his ideal kingship was one that would work towards achieving civic virtue and social harmony, a "just liberty" and the "preservation and improvement of our reason". George I and the oligarchy behind Walpole, however, were far from Toland's ideal.

== Contributions to natural philosophy ==
Toland influenced Baron d'Holbach's ideas about physical motion. In his Letters to Serena, Toland claimed that rest, or absence of motion, is not merely relative. Actually, for Toland, rest is a special case of motion. When there is a conflict of forces, the body that is apparently at rest is influenced by as much activity and passivity as it would be if it were moving.

== Religious thought ==
The resemblance, both in title and in principles, of Christianity not Mysterious to Locke's 1695 Reasonableness of Christianity, led to a prompt disavowal on Locke's part of the supposed identity of opinions, and subsequently to the controversy between Edward Stillingfleet and Locke. Toland's next work of importance, the Life of Milton (1698) referred to "the numerous supposititious pieces under the name of Christ and His apostles and other great persons", provoked the charge that he had called in question the genuineness of the New Testament writings. Toland replied in his Amyntor, or a Defence of Milton's Life (1699), to which he added a remarkable list of what are now called New Testament apocrypha. In his remarks he opened up the question of the history of the Biblical canon.

Toland identified himself as a pantheist in his publication Socinianism Truly Stated, by a pantheist in 1705. At the time when he wrote Christianity not Mysterious he was careful to distinguish himself from both sceptical atheists and orthodox theologians. After having formulated a stricter version of Locke's epistemological rationalism, Toland then goes on to show that there are no facts or doctrines from the Bible which are not perfectly plain, intelligible and reasonable, being neither contrary to reason nor incomprehensible to it. All revelation is human revelation; that which is not rendered understandable is to be rejected as gibberish.

However, David Berman has argued for an atheistic reading of Toland, demonstrating contradictions between Christianity not Mysterious and Toland's Two Essays (London, 1695). Berman's reading of Toland and Charles Blount attempts to show that Toland deliberately obscured his real atheism so as to avoid prosecution whilst attempting to subliminally influence unknowing readers, specifically by creating contradictions in his work which can only be resolved by reducing Toland's God to a pantheistic one, and realising that such a non-providential God is, for Blount, Toland and Colins, "...no God, or as good as no God...In short, the God of theism is blictri for Toland; only the determined material God of pantheism exists, and he (or it) is really no God."

After his Christianity not Mysterious, Toland's "Letters to Serena" constitute his major contribution to philosophy. In the first three letters, he develops a historical account of the rise of superstition arguing that human reason cannot ever fully liberate itself from prejudices. In the last two letters, he founds a metaphysical materialism grounded in a critique of monist substantialism. Later on, we find Toland continuing his critique of church government in Nazarenus which was first more fully developed in his "Primitive Constitution of the Christian Church", a clandestine writing in circulation by 1705. The first book of "Nazarenus" calls attention to the right of the Ebionites to a place in the early church. The thrust of his argument was to push to the very limits the applicability of canonical scripture to establish institutionalised religion. Later works of special importance include Tetradymus wherein can be found Clidophorus, a historical study of the distinction between esoteric and exoteric philosophies.

His Pantheisticon, sive formula celebrandae sodalitatis socraticae (Pantheisticon, or the Form of Celebrating the Socratic Society), of which he printed a few copies for private circulation only, gave great offence as a sort of liturgic service made up of passages from pagan authors, in imitation of the Church of England liturgy. The title also was in those days alarming, and still more so the mystery which the author threw around the question how far such societies of pantheists actually existed. The term "pantheism" was used by Toland to describe the philosophy of Spinoza.

Toland was famous for distinguishing exoteric philosophy—what one says publicly about religion—from esoteric philosophy—what one confides to trusted friends. In 2007 Fouke's Philosophy and Theology in a Burlesque Mode: John Toland and the Way of Paradox presented an analysis of Toland's 'exoteric strategy' of speaking as others speak, but with a different meaning. He argues that Toland's philosophy and theology had little to do with positive expression of beliefs, and that his philosophical aim was not to develop an epistemology, a true metaphysical system, an ideal form of governance, or the basis of ethical obligation, but to find ways to participate in the discourses of others while undermining those discourses from within. Fouke traces Toland's practices to Shaftesbury's conception of a comic or 'derisory' mode of philosophising aimed at exposing pedantry, imposture, dogmatism, and folly.

== Influence and legacy ==
Toland was a man not of his time; one who advocated principles of virtue in duty, principles that had little place in the England of Robert Walpole, governed by cynicism and self-interest. His intellectual reputation, moreover, was subsequently eclipsed by the likes of John Locke and David Hume, and still more by Montesquieu and the French radical thinkers. Edmund Burke in his Reflections on the Revolution in France wrote dismissively of Toland and his fellows: "Who, born within the last 40 years, has read one word of Collins, and Toland, and Tindal, and Chubb, and Morgan, and that whole race who called themselves Freethinkers?"

Still, in Christianity not Mysterious, the book for which he is best known, Toland laid down a challenge not just to the authority of the established church, but to all inherited and unquestioned authority. It was thus as radical politically and philosophically, as it was theologically.

Of his influence, humanities professor Robert Pattison wrote: "Two centuries earlier the establishment would have burned him as a heretic; two centuries later it would have made him a professor of comparative religion in a California university. In the rational Protestant climate of early 18th-century Britain, he was merely ignored to death."

However, Toland managed to find success after his death: Thomas Hollis, the great 18th century book collector and editor, commissioned the London bookseller Andrew Millar to publish works advocating republican government – a list of titles which included Toland's work in 1760.

== Writings ==
This is not an exhaustive list:

- Christianity Not Mysterious: A Treatise Shewing, That there is nothing in the Gospel Contrary to Reason, Nor Above It: And that no Christian Doctrine can be properly called A Mystery (1696) [book]
- A Discourse on Coins, by Seignor Bernardo Davanzati, anno 1588, translated out of Italian by John Toland (1696). (Note: Coinage and particularly coin clipping was a hot topic of public concern around 1696).
- An Apology for Mr. Toland (1697) (concerning Toland's earlier Christianity Not Mysterious).
- An Argument Shewing, that a Standing Army Is Inconsistent with a Free Government, and absolutely destructive to the Constitution of the English Monarchy (1697)
- The Militia Reformed: An easy scheme of furnishing England with a constant land force, capable to prevent or to subdue any foreign power, and to maintain perpetual quite at home, without endangering the public liberty. (1698). (Note: The militia question was a hot topic with the British pamphlet-buying public around 1698).
- The Life of John Milton, containing, besides the history of his works, several extraordinary characters of men, of books, sects, parties and opinions. (1698) [book]
- Amyntor, or a Defence of Milton's Life [meaning Toland's earlier book] Containing (I) a general apology for all writings of that kind, (II) a catalogue of books attributed in the primitive times to Jesus Christ, his apostles and other eminent persons, with several important remarks relating to the canon of Scripture, (III) a complete history of the book Eikon Basilike proving Dr Gauden and not King Charles I to be the author of it. (1699).
- Edited James Harrington's Oceana and other Works (1700)
- The Art of Governing by Parties, particularly in Religion, Politics, Parliament, the Bench, and the Ministry; with the ill effects of Parties. (1701).[book]
- Anglia Libera; or the limitation and succession of the crown of England explained and asserted. (1701).[pamphlet]
- Limitations for the next Foreign Successor, or A New Saxon Race: Debated in a Conference betwixt Two Gentlemen; Sent in a Letter to a member of parliament (1701)[pamphlet]
- Propositions for Uniting the Two East India Companies (1701)
- Paradoxes of State, relating to the present juncture of affairs in England and the rest of Europe, chiefly grounded on his Majesty's princely, pious and most gracious speech [referring to a recent keynote speech by the king of England]. (1702).[pamphlet]
- Reasons for inviting the Hanover royals into England.... Together with arguments for making a vigorous war against France. (1702). [pamphlet]
- Vindicius Liberius. (1702). (This pamphlet was another defence of Christianity Not Mysterious, this time against one specific attack.)
- Letters to Serena (1704) [book]
- Hypatia or the History of a most beautiful, most virtuous, most learned and in every way accomplished lady, who was torn to pieces by the clergy of Alexandria to gratify the pride, emulation and cruelty of the archbishop commonly but undeservedly titled St Cyril (1720)
- The Primitive Constitution of the Christian Church (c. 1705; posthume, 1726)
- The Account of the Courts of Prussia and Hanover (1705)
- Socinianism Truly Stated (by "A Pantheist") (1705)
- Translated Matthäus Schiner's A Philippick Oration to Incite the English Against the French (1707)
- Adeisidaemon – or the "Man Without Superstition" (1709)
- Origines Judaicae (1709)
- The Art of Restoring (1710)
- The Jacobitism, Perjury, and Popery of High-Church Priests (1710) [pamphlet]
- An Appeal to Honest People against Wicked Priests (1713)
- Dunkirk or Dover (1713)
- The Art of Restoring (1714) (against Robert Harley, 1st Earl of Oxford and Mortimer|Robert Harley)
- Reasons for Naturalising the Jews in Great Britain and Ireland on the same foot with all Other Nations (1714) [77 pages]
- State Anatomy of Great Britain (1717)
- The Second Part of the State Anatomy (1717)
- Nazarenus: or Jewish, Gentile and Mahometan Christianity, containing the history of the ancient gospel of Barnabas... Also the Original Plan of Christianity explained in the history of the Nazarens.... with... a summary of ancient Irish Christianity... (1718)[book]
- The Probability of the Speedy and Final Destruction of the Pope (1718)
- Tetradymus (1720) (Written in Latin. An English translation was published in 1751)
- Pantheisticon (1720) (Written in Latin. An English translation was published in 1751)
- History of the Celtic Religion and Learning Containing an Account of the Druids (1726)
- A Collection of Several Pieces of Mr John Toland, ed. P. Des Maizeaux, 2 vols. (1726)
