= Paul Henri Mallet =

Genevan writer and historian (1730–1807)

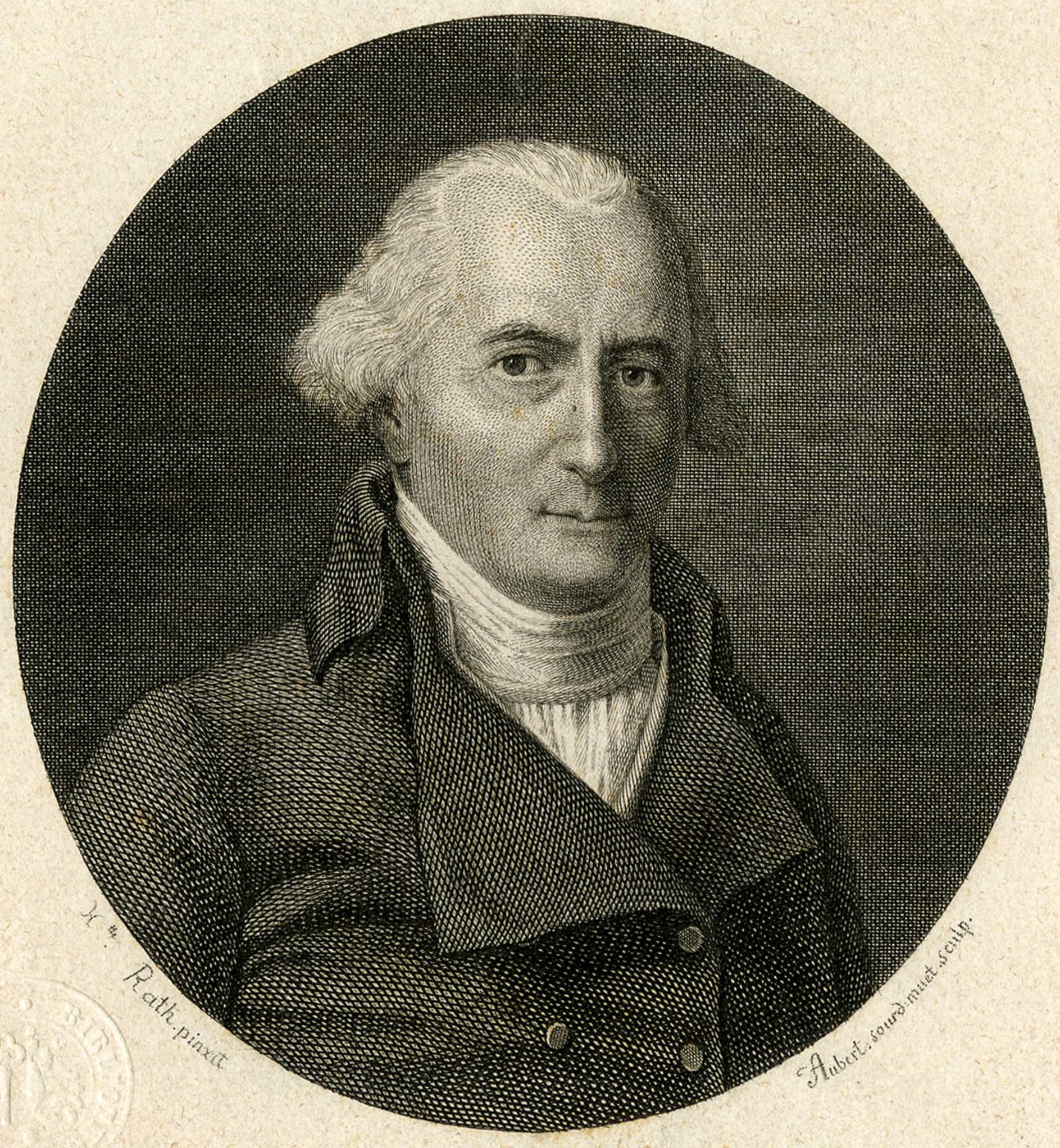
Engraving of Paul Henri Mallet (1730–1807) by Jean-Ernest Aubert, based on a work by Jeanne Henriette Rath

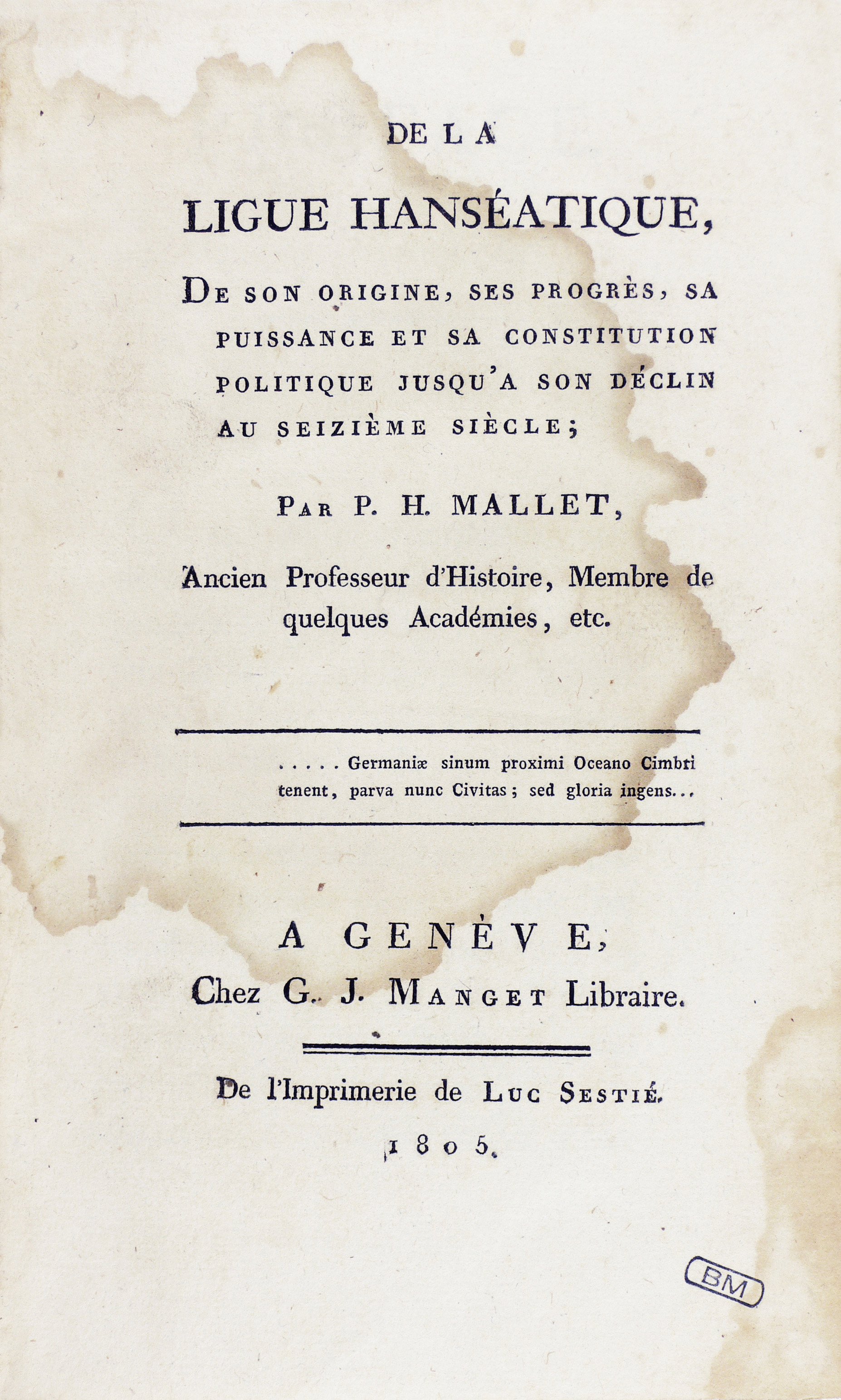
De la ligue hanséatique, 1805

Paul Henri Mallet (20 August 1730 – 8 February 1807) was a Genevan writer and historian. He is best known for his Introduction to the History of Denmark, first translated into English by Thomas Percy as Northern Antiquities, which included the first translation into French of the medieval Edda.

== Life ==
He was born and educated in Geneva, where he earned a law degree, the license de droit, in 1751. He became tutor in the family of the count of Calenberg in Lower Saxony. In 1752 he was appointed professor of belles lettres to the academy at Copenhagen and held the position through 1760.

He was naturally attracted to the study of the ancient literature and history of Denmark, his adopted country, and in 1755 he published the first fruits of his researches, under the title Introduction à l'histoire du Danemarck où l'on traite de la religion, des moeurs, des lois, et des usages des anciens Danois. A second part, more particularly relating to Danish literature, Monuments de la mythologie et de la poesie des Celtes, et particulierement des anciens Scandinaves, was issued in 1756, and was also translated into Danish and German. A translation into English, with notes and preface, by Bishop Thomas Percy, was issued in 1770 under the title of Northern Antiquities (republished with additions in 1847). The book had a wide circulation, and attracted much attention on account of its being the first translation into French of the Edda.

The king of Denmark showed his appreciation by choosing Mallet to be preceptor of the crown prince, a position held 1755–1760. In 1760 he returned to Geneva and became professor of history in his native city. He became a correspondent of l'Académie des inscriptions et belles-lettres in 1763 and served as a member of the Swiss Council of Two Hundred 1764–1789. While in Geneva, he was requested by the czarina Catherine the Great to undertake the education of the heir-apparent of Russia (afterwards the Czar Paul I), but declined. A more appealing invitation led to his accompanying the young Lord Mountstuart as a tutor in his Grand Tour travels through Italy, where Mallet met and clashed with James Boswell in Rome, and thence to England, where he was presented at court and commissioned to write the history of the House of Brunswick. He had previously received similar commission from the landgrave of Hesse-Kassel (or Hesse-Cassel) for the reparation of a history of the House of Hesse, and both works were completed in 1785.

The quietness of a literary life was rudely broken by the French Revolution, to which he was openly hostile. His leanings to the unpopular side were so obnoxious to his fellow-citizens that he was obliged to quit his native country in 1792, and remained in exile till 1801. He died 8 February 1807 at Geneva.

== Works ==
A memoir of his life and writings, by Sismondi, was published at Geneva in 1807. Besides the Introduction to the History of Denmark, his principal works are:

- Histoire du Danemarch (3 vols., Copenhagen, 1758–1777)
- Histoire de la maison de Hesse (4 vols., 1767–1785)
- Histoire de la maison de Brunswick (4 vols., 1767–1785)
- Histoire de la maison et des etats du Mecklenbourg (1796)
- Histoire des Suisses ou Helvetiens (4 vols., Geneva, 1803) (mainly an abridgment of Johannes von Müller's great history)
- Histoire de la ligue hanseatique (1805).
