= Arthur Tatham =

Arthur Tatham (1808–1874) was a member of the Shoreham Ancients, a group of followers of William Blake. He served as a Church of England priest for more than 40 years.

The second son of Charles Heathcote Tatham, an architect.

Tatham and his brother Frederick Tatham and his sister Julia were all associated with the Ancients (art group).

His sister Julia married another member, George Richmond, the father of William Blake Richmond.

He was for over forty years rector of Broadoak and Boconnoc, Cornwall, (1832–74) and prebendary of Exeter Cathedral from 1860. He wrote two pamphlets, one them being "A Cornish Bishopric: a statement of facts" (1859), part of the campaign for a modern Bishop of Cornwall (he was in favour of Bodmin as the seat of the bishop). This proposal was dismissed by the government in 1860,
