= Francis Oliver Finch =

English painter (1802–1862)

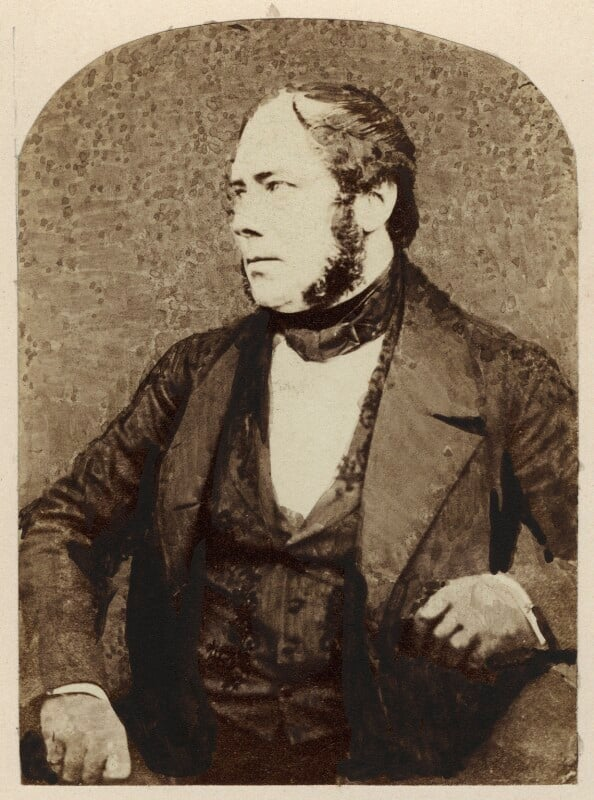
Finch in the 1850s

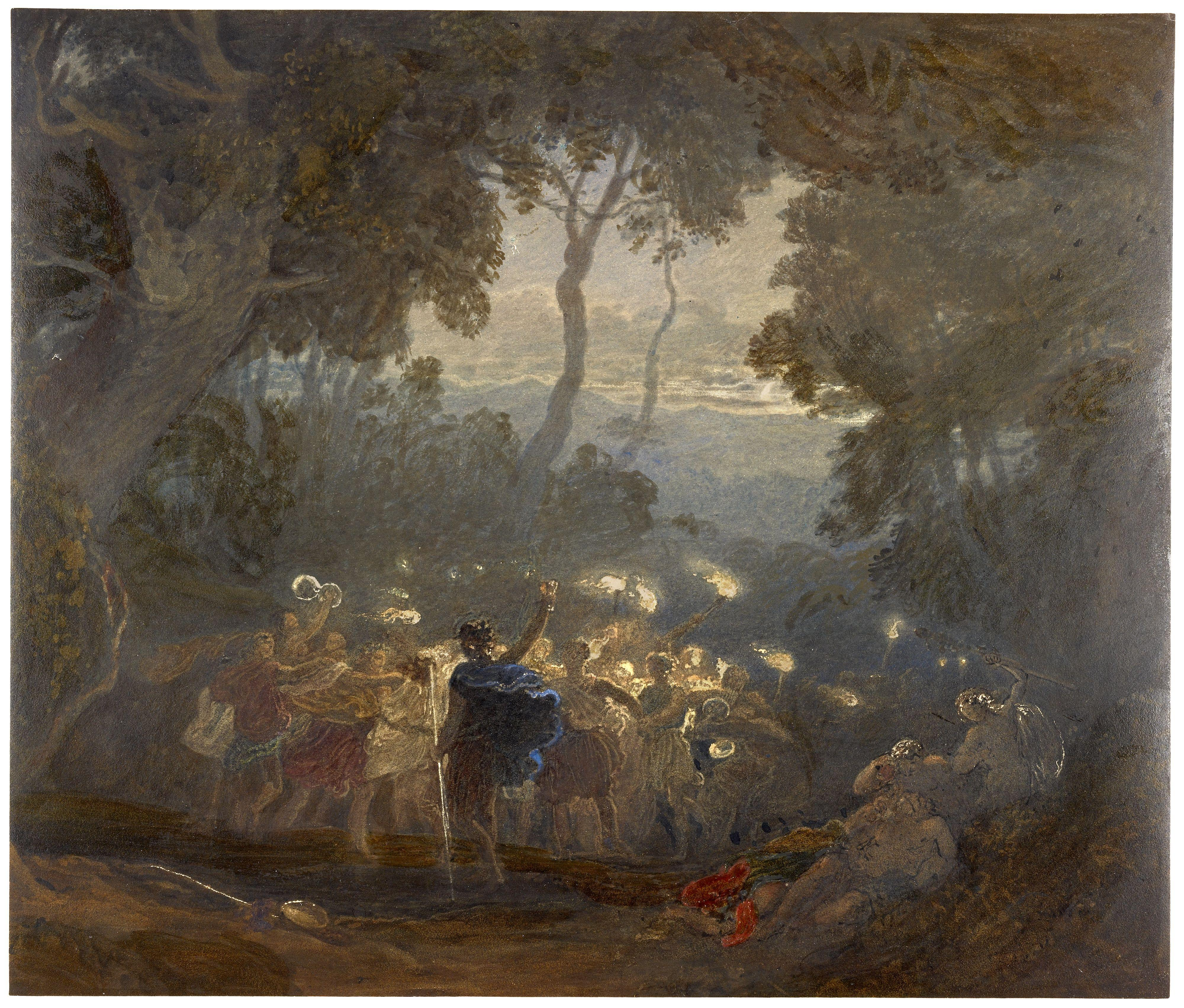
Francis Oliver Finch, The Dell of Comus (illustrating John Milton's Comus), watercolour c. 1835

Francis Oliver Finch (22 November 1802 – 27 August 1862), was an English watercolour painter, and a member of The Ancients, the group of young artists formed around Samuel Palmer and the elderly William Blake in the 1820s.

== Life ==
Finch was the son of Francis Finch, a merchant in Friday Street, Cheapside, in the City of London.He was born on 22 November 1802, and spent his boyhood at Stone near Aylesbury. At the age of twelve, by then fatherless, he was placed under John Varley, with whom he worked for five years, a friend having paid a premium of £200. Among his earliest patrons was Lord Northwick, who employed Finch in making views of his mansion and grounds. Some time after leaving his master's studio the same friend who had assisted in placing him there afforded him the benefit of a tour through Scotland.

After his return he was uncertain whether he should continue the practice of landscape or study at the Royal Academy. He joined Sass's life academy and produced several portraits, but circumstances drawing him back to landscape-painting he became a candidate for admission to the newly formed Society of Painters in Water Colours. On 11 February 1822 he was elected an associate, and on 4 June 1827 a member of that society. He first exhibited at the Royal Academy in 1817, while living at 44 Conduit Street. He married in the spring of 1837, and lived in Charlotte Street for some time, and later in Argyle Square, Euston Road.

He had a fine voice, and was a talented musician, and a poet. He published a collection of sonnets entitled An Artist's Dream.

== Works ==
Among his best works may be counted Garmallon's Tomb, (oil 1820); View of Loch Lomond (1822); View on the River Tay (1827); View of Windsor Castle (1829); View of the College of Aberdeen (1832); The Dell of Comus (1835); Alpine Scene, Evening (1838); A Watch Tower (1840); The Thames near Cookham, Berkshire (1845); Ruined Temple, Evening (1852); Rocky Glen, Evening (1855); The Curfew - Gray's Elegy (1860); Pastoral Retreat (1861); and Moonlight over the Sea (1862). His portrait was engraved by A. Roffe.

== Death ==
On 10 October 1861 Finch lost the use of his limbs. He died 27 August 1862 and was buried on the west side of Highgate Cemetery.

== Sources ==
This article incorporates text from a publication now in the public domain: "Finch, Francis Oliver". Dictionary of National Biography. London: Smith, Elder & Co. 1885–1900.
