= Catherine Blake =

Wife of poet, painter and engraver William Blake

Catherine Blake, c. 1805, by William Blake

Catherine Blake (née Boucher; 25 April 1762 – 18 October 1831) was the wife of the poet, painter, and engraver William Blake, and a vital presence and assistant throughout his life.

== Life ==
Catherine Boucher was born on 25 April 1762, the youngest child of William Boucher (1714–1794), a market gardener, and Mary Davis (1716–1782). She came from a poor family and entered the biographical record mainly through the recollections later gathered around William Blake. One early account describes her as a "demure young woman"; when her mother asked which of her acquaintances she might marry, Catherine reportedly replied that she had not yet met such a man.

She met William Blake in Battersea in 1781, while he was visiting the area after the failure of an earlier courtship. The story, as repeated by Blake's early biographers, makes Catherine's sympathy the decisive moment of the relationship. When Blake told her of his disappointment in love, she pitied him; he replied, "Do you pity me? Then I love you." Their courtship was brief but deliberate. Blake, five years older than Catherine, married her on 18 August 1782 in St Mary's Church, Battersea. She signed the register with an "X", "like many brides of her day", since there were then "no national schools... and even regular Sunday schools had not been invented".

The marriage lasted until William Blake's death in 1827. It also became a working partnership. Blake taught Catherine to read and write, and then to assist with his printing press, proofs, colouring and sales. Biographers consequently present her not only as his wife but as the person who helped sustain the material conditions of his art. Some descriptions of Blake's female figures have also treated Catherine as a possible model for his "invariable type of woman", described as "tall, slender, and with unusually long legs".

The couple did not have children, and the early years of the marriage have often been discussed through William Blake's religious and sexual ideas. The only documented affiliation of William and Catherine with an organised religious body came in April 1789, when they signed as sympathizers at the First General Conference of the Swedenborgian New Church. They did not become members, and William's later annotations to Swedenborg show a shifting and increasingly critical engagement with Swedenborgian thought.

Later writers turned that context into a more dramatic story about the marriage. Alexander Gilchrist mentioned early "stormy times" and jealousy, but gave no clear incident. Algernon Charles Swinburne, writing in 1868, repeated a qualified report that Blake had once proposed taking a second wife and had met with tears and objections. W. B. Yeats and Edwin Ellis later recast the story as a proposed concubine "in the Old Testament manner", abandoned because it made Catherine cry. Henry Crabb Robinson also recorded in 1826 that Blake said the Bible taught him that wives should be held in common. No documentary evidence confirms that Blake tried to introduce another woman into the household. Modern commentators therefore treat the anecdote cautiously. Robert Rix calls it a dubious oral tradition and reads Blake's language about marriage in relation to Swedenborgian debates over spiritual, anti-possessive love rather than as evidence of a literal plan for concubinage. E. P. Thompson similarly places the issue within early New Church disputes over Swedenborg's Conjugial Love, while suggesting that the Blakes may have taken neither side in the dispute. Ackroyd rejects the conjecture that Blake tried to bring a second wife into the household, stating that there is no evidence that he was unfaithful to Catherine.

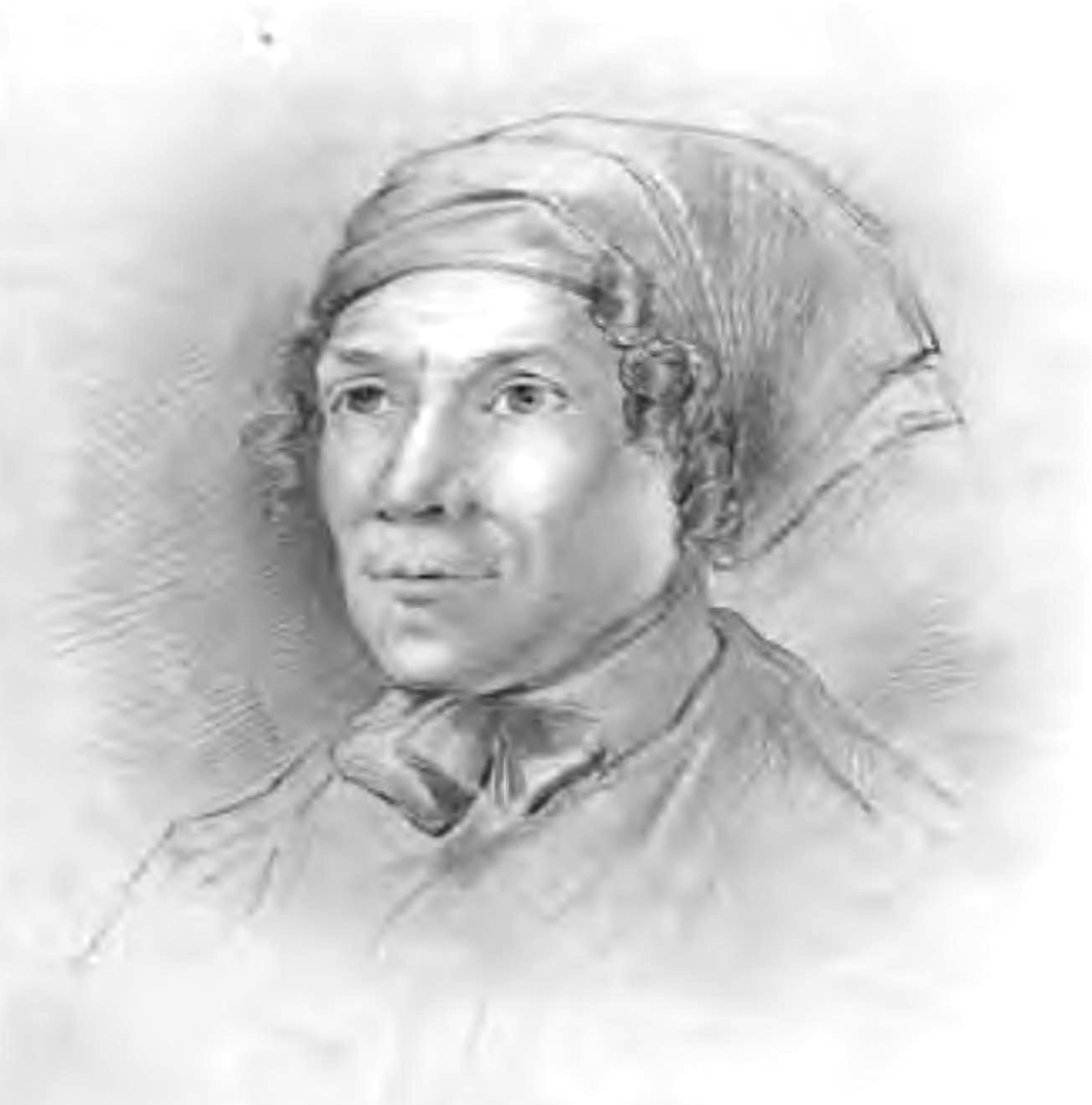
Pencil drawing by George Richmond after Tatham's life sketch of Catherine Blake

The surviving testimony from the couple's later years presents a close and durable partnership. In 1802, William Hayley wrote that William "and his excellent wife (a true helpmate!) pass the plates thro' a rolling press in their cottage together". On his deathbed, Blake stopped work, asked Catherine to remain still, and drew her portrait as his last work, telling her, "you have ever been an angel to me".

After her husband's death, Catherine first received help from Blake's patron John Linnell and then lived for a time with Blake's admirer Frederick Tatham, nominally as a housekeeper. She continued to sell Blake's works and, according to later accounts, said that she consulted William's spirit before doing so. She died on 18 October 1831. Tatham claimed that she had bequeathed Blake's remaining works to him; after his conversion to Irvingite beliefs, he destroyed a number of them, asserting that they had been inspired by the devil. Catherine and William were both buried in Bunhill Fields in London, although not in the same grave.

== Role in Blake's art ==
Throughout her husband's uneven career, Catherine not only took an active role in the production of William's engravings and illuminated books; she also ran the household finances and offered strong practical support. William's friend J. T. Smith said that Blake "allowed her, to the last moment of his practice, to take off his proof impressions and print his works, which she did most carefully." Catherine's role in colouring at least some of William's illuminated books has been wide, although her hand is usually attributed to some of the more clumsily rendered passages. Her work as a printer is held in higher regard.

== Role in literature ==
It has often been suggested that the figure of Enitharmon in Blake's mythology is partly inspired by Catherine. Enitharmon is the wife of the "eternal prophet" Los in Blake's writings. Catherine is explicitly identified as the poet's "shadow of delight" in the second part of Blake's Milton.

In William Hayley's writings on ideal marriages, Catherine is presented as a model wife. In more recent literature, she is the central character in Janet Adele Warner's novel Other Sorrows, Other Joys: The Marriage of Catherine Sophia Boucher and William Blake (2001) and also features in Tracy Chevalier's novel Burning Bright (2007). She is an amateur detective in short stories by Keith Heller.

Jack Shepherd's stage play In Lambeth dramatised a visit by Thomas Paine to the Lambeth home of William and Catherine Blake in 1789. It was first performed at the East Dulwich Tavern in July 1989. The play was later adapted for television in the BBC Two Encounters series (which featured similar fictionalized meetings between historical figures) and was first broadcast on 4 July 1993. It was directed by Sebastian Graham-Jones and featured Mark Rylance as William, Bob Peck as Paine, and Lesley Clare O'Neill as Catherine.
