= Charles Heathcote Tatham =

English architect

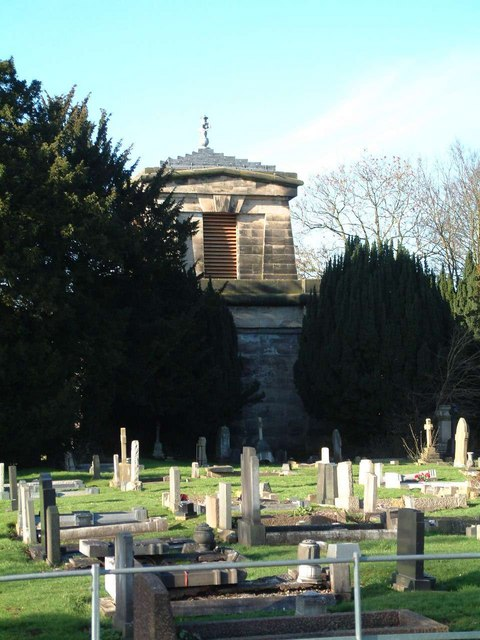
Trentham Mausoleum, Stone Road, Trentham, built 1807–8 to a design by Tatham

Charles Heathcote Tatham (8 February 1772 in Westminster, London – 10 April 1842 in London), was an English architect of the early nineteenth century.

== Early life ==
He was born in Duke Street, Westminster, the youngest of five sons of Ralph Tatham who had come to London from Stockton in County Durham, by his wife Elizabeth Bloxham, the daughter of a well to do hosier in Cateaton Street. The father was first a "Spanish merchant", went bankrupt, became a horse breeder in Essex, went bankrupt again, and was then asked in 1779 by Captain (afterwards Lord) Rodney, whom he had sheltered from his creditors "a great deal of his time" at Havering, if he would like to be his secretary in his command of the Leeward Islands fleet. Ralph Tatham, at 47, rose to the challenge, accepted, and set out for Portsmouth; but he fell ill on the way and died of cholera at the Castle & Falcon in Aldersgate Street.

Charles was educated at Louth Grammar School, Lincolnshire, as was his elder brother Henry, later a gun-maker and sword-cutler by Charing Cross; his eldest brother Thomas became a cabinet maker and "upholsterer to the Prince Regent", his brothers William and John respectively a naval officer and a London solicitor.

== Early career and travels ==
Returning to London at the age of 16, he was engaged as a clerk by Samuel Pepys Cockerell, architect and surveyor. Learning nothing there, as he thought, he ran away, and returned to his mother's lodgings, where he remained working hard for a year or more at the five orders of architecture and French ornament and studying mathematics.

When he was nearly 19 Henry Holland, the Prince of Wales's architect in the alterations of Carlton House and the Pavilion, Brighton, received him into his house, and two years later offered him £60 a year for two years to enable him to pursue his studies at Rome. He had been introduced to Holland through his relative John Linnell, who was in charge of one of London's leading cabinet-maker and upholsterer's firms and a rival to Thomas Chippendale. At Holland's office Tatham designed and drew at large all the ornamental decorations for Drury Lane Theatre. The whole proscenium was marked off from his drawings by Charles Catton the younger, who painted the designs in fresco. The executed designs for the boxes in the theatre were by Linnell and they survive at the V&A in the Print Room.

Together with Samuel Wyatt he also designed Dropmore House in Buckinghamshire which was built in the 1790s for Lord Grenville, later the Prime Minister who pushed through the law abolishing the slave trade.

With Holland's help, and a loan of £100 from John Birch, surgeon-extraordinary to the king, he felt justified in May 1794 in starting for Italy, travelling in company with his peer Joseph Gandy. He spent his time industriously, chiefly in Rome and Naples in company with Signor Asprucci, architect to Prince Borghese and Don Isidoro Velasquez, an exhibitioner from the academy of Madrid, both, like Tatham, students of classical architecture.

Tatham's chief friends during his stay in Italy were Canova, Madame Angelica Kauffman and her husband; Abbate Carlo Bonomi, brother of Joseph Bonomi, RA; Sir William and Lady Hamilton at Naples; and lastly, Frederick Howard, 5th Earl of Carlisle, to whose long friendship and patronage he owed much of his success. He left Rome a month or so before Bonaparte's first attack on the papal states in 1797; returning through Dresden, Berlin, and Prague, and making architectural drawings on the way. As the result of his studies he etched and published in 1799 Ancient Ornamental Architecture at Rome and in Italy. A second edition, containing more than a hundred plates, appeared in 1803, and a German translation was published at Weimar in 1805.

His old master, Holland, had also commissioned him to collect in Italy antique fragments relating to ornamental architecture. He got together a noble assemblage, which was brought to England two years later. Tatham published a description of them in 1806. As of about 1895, they, along with his own collection of architectural drawings made at the same time, were in the collection of Sir John Soane in Lincoln's Inn Fields. Tatham first exhibited at the Royal Academy in 1797, and continued to do so until 1836, contributing in all fifty-three designs.

Tatham moved from 101 Park Street, Mayfair, first to York Place, and then to a house with a beautiful garden in Alpha Road, which he built for himself. He lived on intimate terms with Thomas Chevalier, surgeon to George III, Benjamin Robert Haydon, Samuel Bagster the publisher, and John Linnell.

== Designs ==
On 15 August 1799 the treasury issued a general invitation to artists to send competitive designs for a national monument of a pillar or obelisk two hundred feet high upon a basement of thirty feet "in commemoration of the late glorious victories of the British navy." Tatham sent in three designs. Finding, after more than two years had passed, that no decision had been made, he published them as etchings, with descriptive text and a dedication to the Earl of Carlisle, in 1802. The project ultimately took shape in Nelson's Column in Trafalgar Square, built to designs of William Railton in 1843.

In 1802 Tatham designed the sculpture gallery at Castle Howard, Yorkshire, and did work at Naworth, Cumberland, for the Earl of Carlisle; and in 1807 the picture gallery at Brocklesby Hall, Lincolnshire, for Lord Yarborough. His etchings for the designs of these galleries, both in the severe classical style in vogue at the time, were published in 1811.

He designed the rebuilding of Roche Court at East Winterslow, Wiltshire for Francis Thomas Egerton in 1804–5, and the mausoleum at Trentham, Staffordshire for George Leveson-Gower, 1st Duke of Sutherland, 1807–08 (in neo-Egyptian style, now Grade I listed).

Before 1816 he designed for the Duke of Bridgwater the portion of Cleveland House, St. James's, which lay to the west of the gallery. This building was destroyed when Sir Charles Barry designed the later Bridgwater House in 1847.

== Later life ==
Tatham was apt to be masterful and litigious in professional matters, and engaged in lawsuits most unwisely with more than one of his employers. Refusing work for builders and others, he lost his practice. In 1834 he fell into pecuniary difficulties and his house and collection of objects of interest were sold, and at the age of 62 it seemed that he would have to begin life anew. His friends – the Right Hon. Thomas Grenville, the Duchess of Sutherland and others – rallied round him, and in 1837 obtained for him the post of warden of Holy Trinity Hospital, Greenwich, where he ended his days happily and usefully.

== Family ==
Tatham married, in 1801, Harriet Williams, the daughter of a famous button-maker in St. Martin's Lane. By her he had four sons and six daughters. His eldest son Frederick, sculptor and afterwards portrait-painter, exhibited forty-eight pictures in the Royal Academy between 1825 and 1854. He was the close friend of William Blake and his wife. His second son, Arthur, was for more than forty years rector of Broadoak and Boconnoc in Cornwall, and prebendary of Exeter Cathedral. His second daughter, Julia, in 1831, married George Richmond the portrait-painter, the father of Sir William Blake Richmond, KCB RA.

Tatham, who was member of the Academy of St. Luke at Rome, of the Institute of Bologna, and of the Architects' Society of London, left behind him copious reminiscences which had not been published by 1895. Also around 1895, a portrait of Tatham by Thomas Kearsley was in possession of his grandson, the Rev. Canon Richmond, and recently purchased at Sotheby's by his twice great-great-great grandson William Rann Kennedy. Also a large crayon portrait by Benjamin Robert Haydon was in the print-room of the British Museum.
