= Edward Calvert (painter) =

English painter

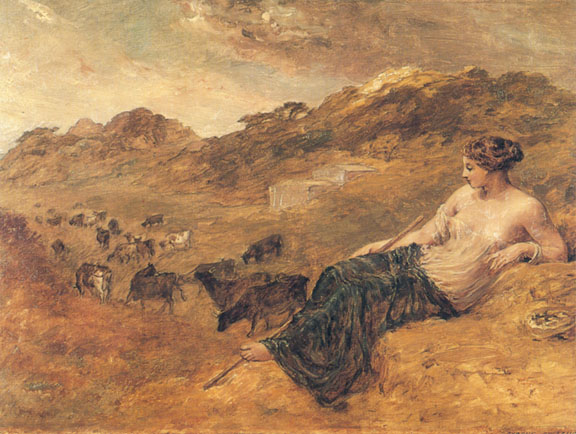
Cyrene and Cattle by Edward Calvert (1830s or 1840s)

Edward Calvert (20 September 1799 – 14 July 1883) was an English printmaker and painter.

== Biography ==
=== Early life ===
Edward Calvert was born in Appledore, near Bideford in Devon, the son of Captain Roland Calvert. After a spell in the Navy he studied art at Plymouth and the Royal Academy Schools (1824). His early visionary work was greatly inspired by William Blake, and he became a member of the Blake-influenced group known as The Ancients which met at Samuel Palmer's in Shoreham, Kent in the later 1820s and early 1830s.

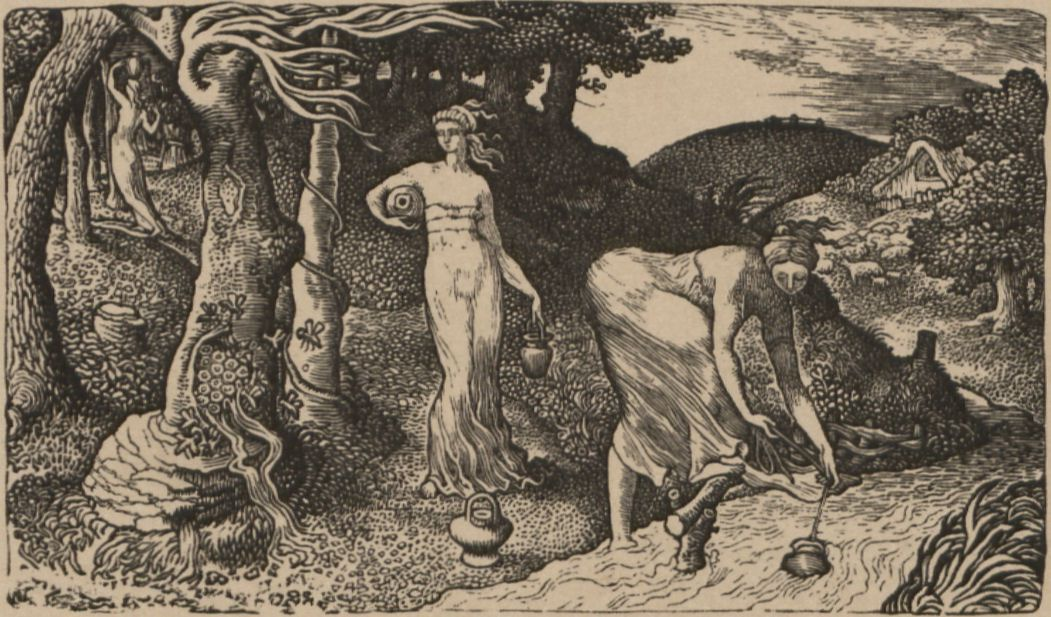
The Brook (1829), Aberdeen Archives, Gallery and Museums

=== Work ===
Amongst Calvert's finest works are exquisite miniature wood engravings which date from this early period; his wood and copper engravings all date from 1827–31, but were only seen by friends until published by his son in 1893 in an edition of 350. He also made etchings. In 1844 he visited Greece.

=== Personal life and later years ===
Much of his subsequent life was spent with his wife Mary, in Dalston and nearby Hackney, a short distance from London. His work from this later period (not considered his best) shows a Classical influence.

Edward Calvert and his wife are buried at Abney Park Cemetery, Stoke Newington, London; the headstone reads He was welcomed in Helicon.

=== Legacy ===
The British Museum has some 65 of his drawings, and about 40 prints, as well as many of the printing blocks and plates for them.

His third son, Samuel Calvert, was an artist and engraver active in Australia and produced a memoir of his father in 1893.
