= Ancients (art group) =

Group of English artists who admired William Blake

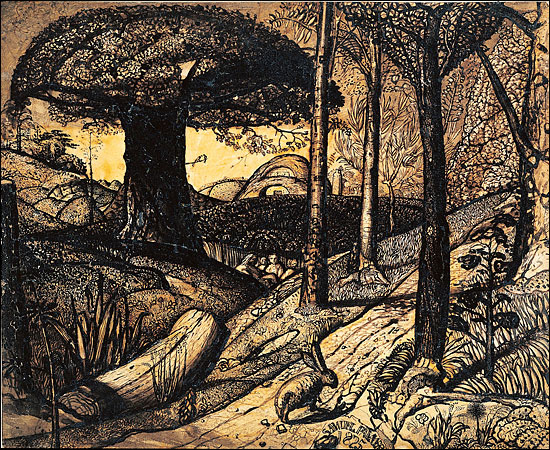
Early Morning, 1825, by Samuel Palmer

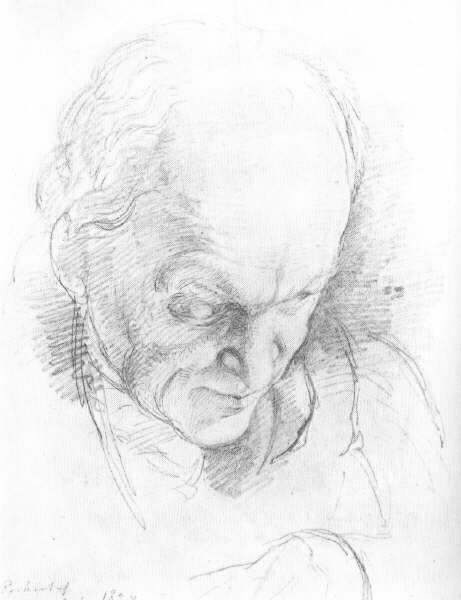
Portrait of William Blake drawn by John Linnell (1820)

The Ancients (also known as the Shoreham Ancients) were a group of young English artists and others who were brought together around 1824 by their attraction to archaism in art and admiration for the work of William Blake (1757–1827), who was a generation or two older than the group. The core members of the Ancients were Samuel Palmer, George Richmond, and Edward Calvert. Except for Palmer, the central members who were artists were all students at the Royal Academy of Arts. They met in Blake's apartment, dubbed the "House of Interpreter" and at the home of Samuel Palmer in the Kent village of Shoreham. The Ancients made little impact on the English artistic scene during the ten years or so that the group continued, but several members were later significant artists, and interest in the group has gradually increased since the late 19th century.

They were the first English manifestation of the formalised artistic "brotherhood", an artistic movement whose aims included elements of communal living and promotion of a general vision for society. Continental groups of this sort included the German Nazarene movement and the Barbus in Paris, and the most successful later English example was to be the Pre-Raphaelite Brotherhood. Like these groups they represented an oppositional break-away from the academic art establishment, and looked back to an idealized version of the past. They pursued equality among their members as a reaction to the hierarchical structure of the conventional art world. Like Nazarenes and Barbus, they promoted the wearing of special revivalist costume, though only Palmer seems often to have worn it in practice; it seems to be shown in some portraits of Palmer by Richmond such as the bust-length miniature and chalk drawing (1829, both National Portrait Gallery), which shows a round-necked pleated smock under a coat with a loose untidy collar and lapels, combined with somewhat Christ-like long hair and a beard. The Ancients were probably aware of the Nazarenes, but probably not of the Barbus.

== Group aims and activity ==
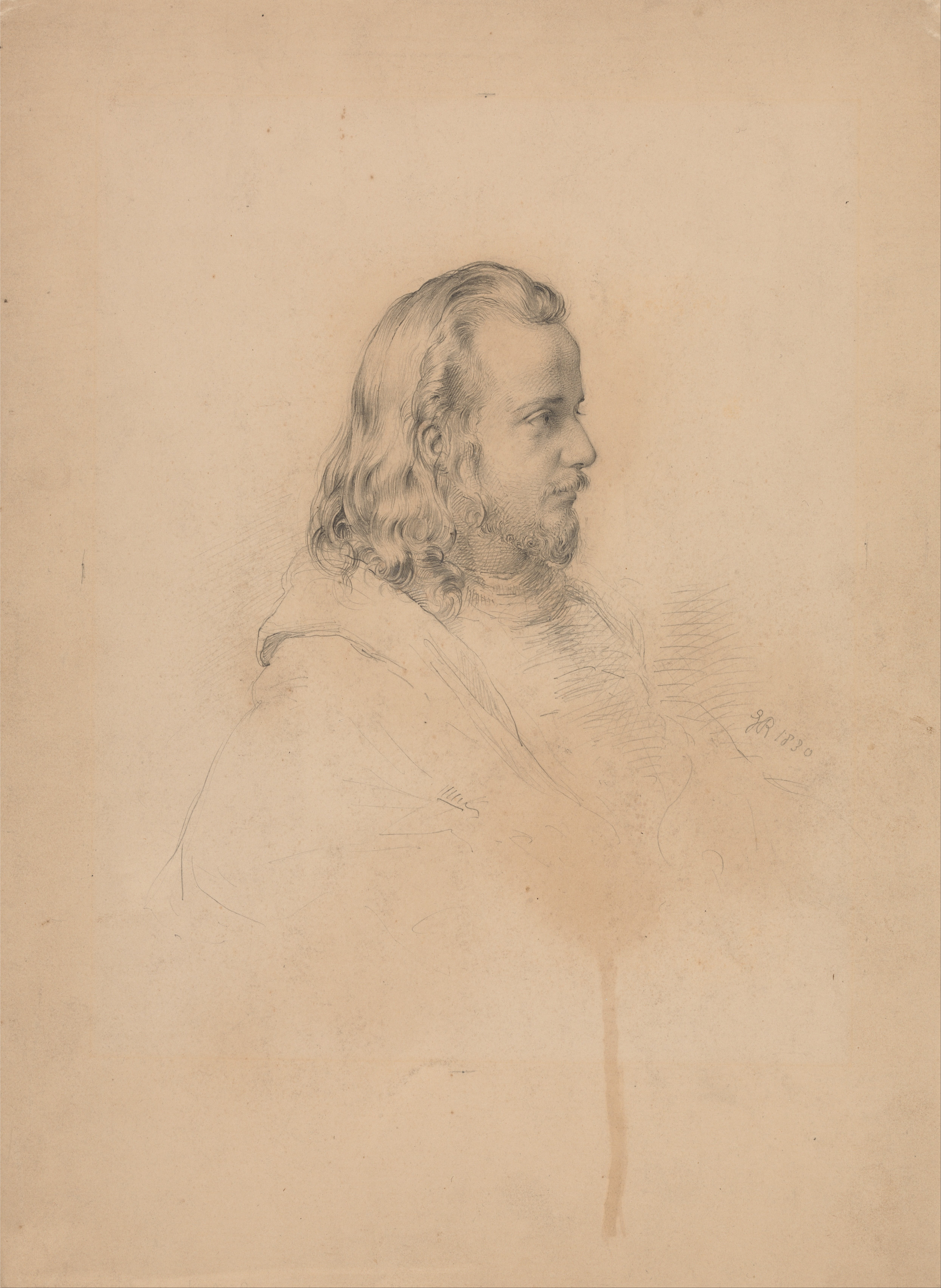
George Richmond drawing of Samuel Palmer wearing "Ancient" clothing, 1830

Unlike Blake they were mostly High Tory in politics, but equally distrustful of the modern mercantile society booming around them, and looked back to an idealized ruralist past. They never produced a manifesto, and their activities and relationships are poorly documented; Palmer's son later destroyed most of his father's papers from the period, hinting darkly that they contained sexual material showing "a mental condition ... full of danger, and neither sufficiently masculine nor sufficiently reticent". Most of the information about the group's activities and dynamics comes from memoirs by them or their families and friends recalled several decades later. Their name may have come from John Giles, Palmer's stockbroker cousin, who despite being no artist was an important figure in the group and perhaps the initial instigator, as Palmer's son suggested. He is recorded as very often extolling the superiority of "the ancients" in any context that occurred in conversation, though the word is also an important one for Blake. At this period "ancient" was a vaguer term than in modern English, often used to refer to the medieval or even Renaissance, as in the English legal term "Ancient Monument".

Christiana Payne, in the Grove Dictionary of Art, states,

"Their subject-matter was drawn from the Bible, or from a vision of a golden age of pastoral innocence and abundance that had both Christian and Vergilian overtones."

The artist members submitted works for the Royal Academy exhibitions, many of which were exhibited, but these "stimulated no critical enthusiasm and were evidently not considered sufficiently threatening to provoke outrage, as the Pre-Raphaelites were to do a generation later". None of the exhibited works seem to have been sold, and the group received very few commissions for works in "Ancient" style, though Richmond's successful career as a conventional portraitist took off in the early 1830s. Nor did the people of Shoreham seem to take objection to Palmer and his visitors, though he records they were known by some locals as the Extollagers, an attempt at "astrologers". Palmer added other local properties to his house there, which he rented out for the rest of his life.

Both the Nazarene Brotherhood and the Barbus were able to attempt communal living in abandoned monasteries outside Rome and Paris respectively, but these convenient possibilities on the continent in the Napoleonic period were not available in the London of the 1820s, so Palmer encouraged long-term stays at his house in Shoreham or elsewhere in the village. Most members had commitments of work or family in London that meant their visits were of weeks if not days, and only William Palmer and Welby Sherman seem to have stayed longer. Blake himself made the trip at least once.

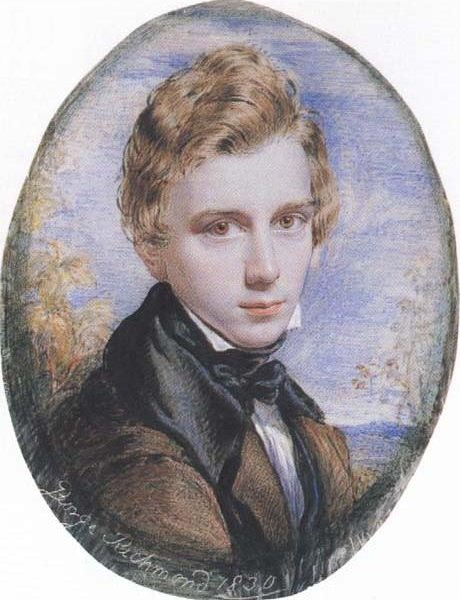
George Richmond self-portrait, 1830, gouache

The artist John Linnell (1792—1882) was not a member of the group however he was close to most of the members. Palmer's reference to Linnell's young daughters as "little ancients" in a letter to him of September 1824 is a key piece of evidence as to the date the group was formed (Palmer later married one of them, Hannah). Linnel was seven years older than Calvert, the oldest in the group, and a strong-minded person who disagreed with many of the group's positions. In a letter to Palmer years later he wrote that "I ought to remember that I was not one of the monthly-meeting elite— when at the Platonic feast of reason and soul only real Greeks from Hackney and Lisson Grove were admitted". Linnell was probably mainly responsible for introducing Palmer and the others to northern European art of the 15th and 16th centuries, which was then relatively little-known in England. He knew Charles (Karl) Aders, a German businessman living in London who had an important collection of early Northern paintings, including a copy of the Ghent Altarpiece, which Linnell enabled the group to visit.

In 1832 Palmer received a further legacy, with which he bought a cottage in St John's Wood in London, and thereafter he gradually spent more time in London. The monthly dinners to which Linnell's letter refers were usually held there. Palmer and Richmond with their wives left together for an extended visit to Italy in 1837, which may be taken as the final end of the group, though most members continued as friends long afterwards. The exposure in Italy to art in the classical tradition influenced both artists to move away from Ancient primitivism. The proximity of Shoreham to the Captain Swing campaign of insurgency among rural labourers in 1830, which Palmer violently opposed, may have disillusioned him as to the peace and harmony of rural life. Richmond wrote in a letter to Palmer in later life "We all wanted thrashing when in a dream of sentiment we thought we were learning art".

== Membership ==
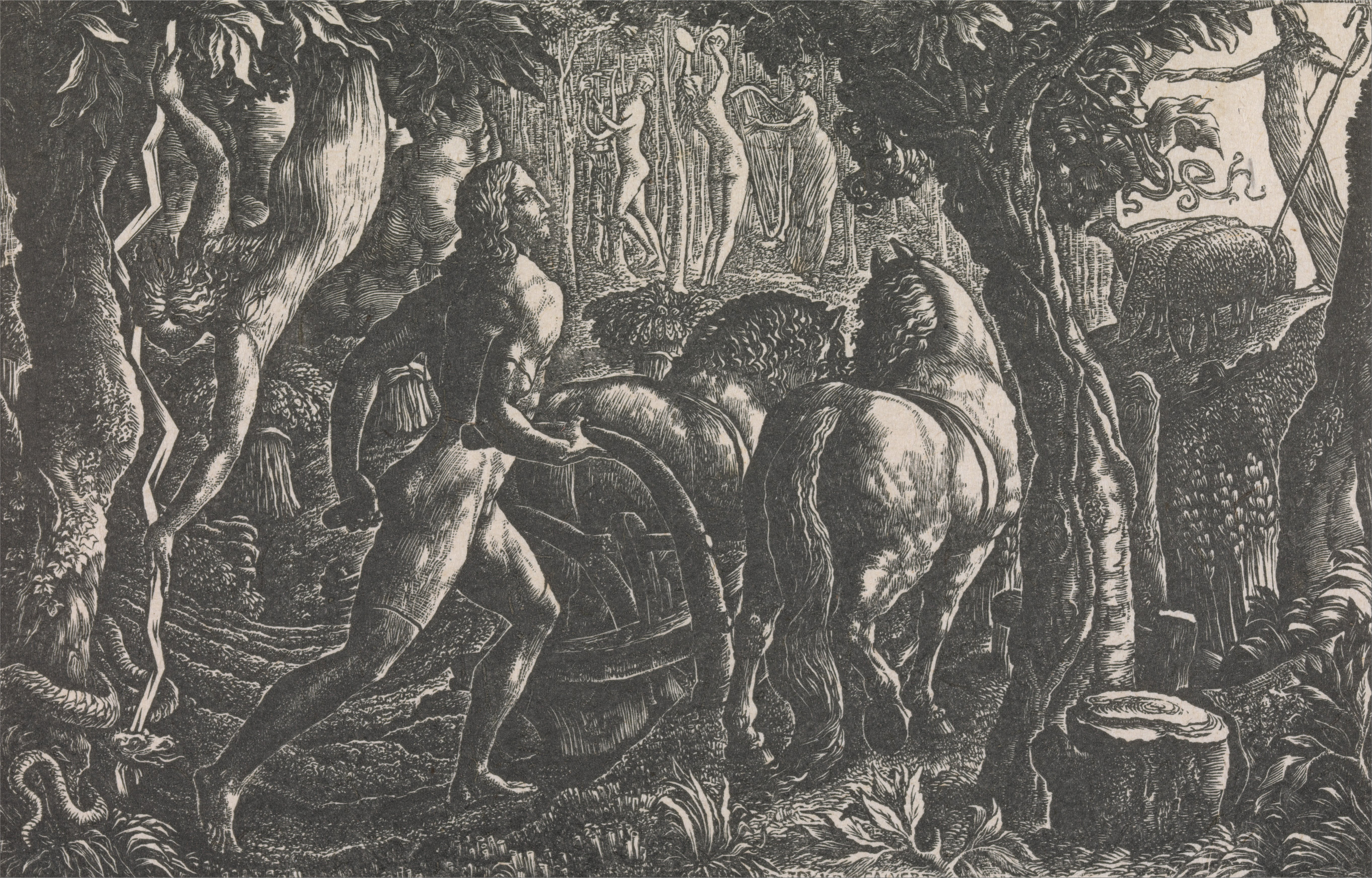
Edward Calvert, The Ploughman, wood engraving of 1827, 94 mm (3.7 in) by 140 mm (5.51 in)

If there was ever any formal list of members, it has not survived, but the main figures, recruited roughly between 1824 and 1827, were:

Artists

- Edward Calvert (1799–1883);
- Frederick Tatham (1805–1878);
- Samuel Palmer (1805–1881);
- George Richmond (1809–1896), the portrait painter;
- Francis Oliver Finch (1802–1862);
- Henry Walter (c. 1786 – 1849);
- Welby Sherman;

Others

- John Giles, a stockbroker, cousin and "constant supporter" of Palmer.
- Arthur Tatham (1808–1874), for over forty years rector of Broadoak and Boconoc, Cornwall, and prebendary of Exeter Cathedral, brother of Frederick Tatham.

Also associated

- Julia Tatham (1811–1881), Frederick Tatham's sister, who married George Richmond;
