= Samuel Calvert (painter) =

British painter (1828–1913)

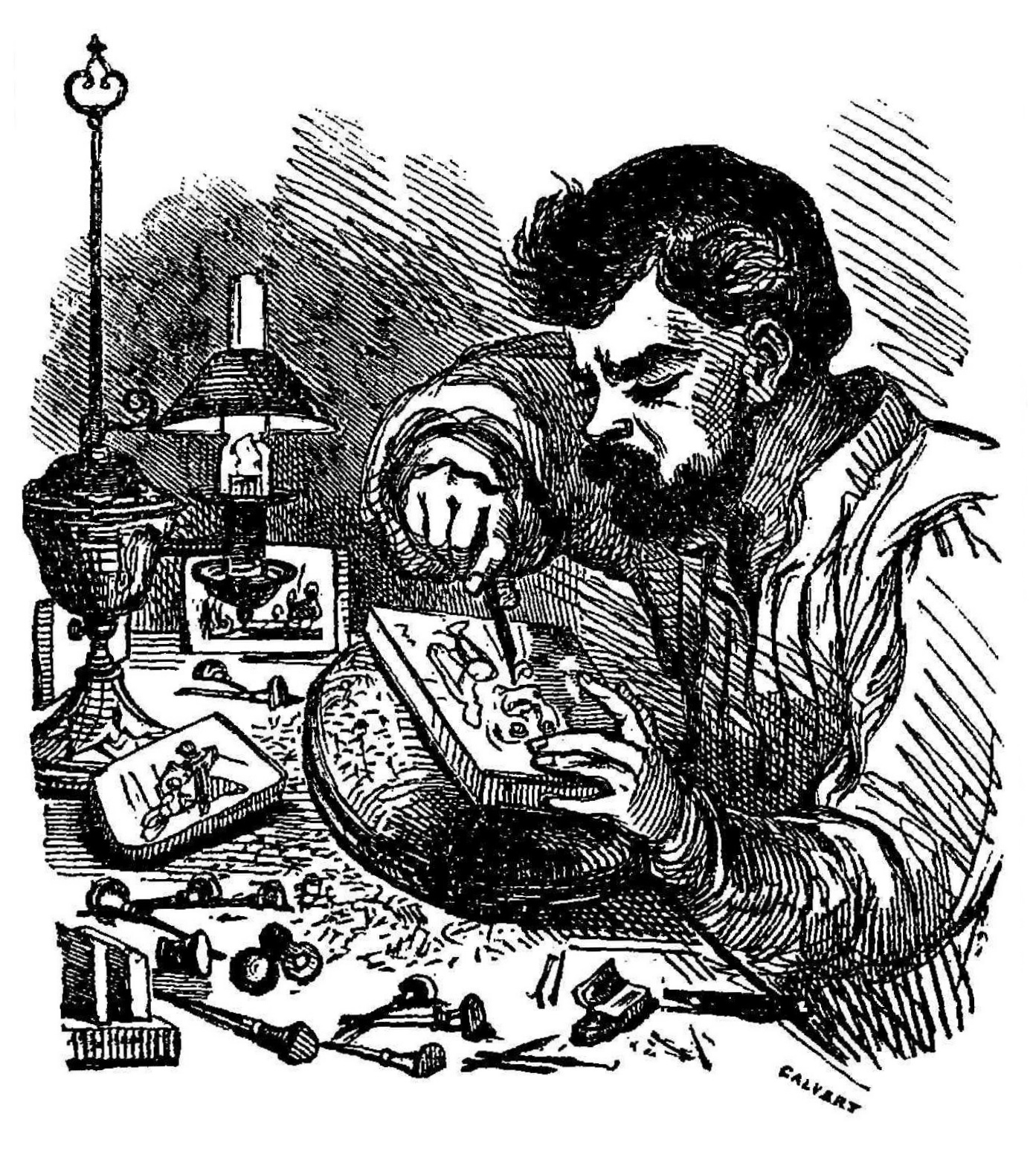
- Calvert at work (from the Melbourne Punch, December 1855).
- Born: 21 November 1828; Brixton, London, England
- Died: 1 January 1913 (aged 84); Crowthorne, Berkshire, England
- Known for: Print-making, wood engraving, illustration, painting

Samuel Calvert (21 November 1828 – 1 January 1913) was a British draughtsman, printer and artist active in Australia, noted for his wood-engravings, published in contemporary periodicals. He was the third son of the renowned engraver and painter, Edward Calvert. During his period in Australia, Samuel Calvert produced hundreds of engraved illustrations for a variety of publications on a wide range of subjects. Calvert also designed postage stamps for the Victorian government. He was one of the founding members of the Victorian Academy of Art, formed in 1870, and showed watercolours and oil paintings at their subsequent exhibitions. Calvert left a legacy of finely-produced wood engravings depicting landscape, contemporary events and portraits.

== Biography ==
=== Early life ===
Samuel Calvert was born on 21 November 1828 the fourth child of Edward Calvert and Mary (née Bennell). His father was a renowned artist and engraver.

Calvert was raised in a family environment dedicated to art and was taught drawing, painting, and print-making skills by his father.

=== Adelaide ===
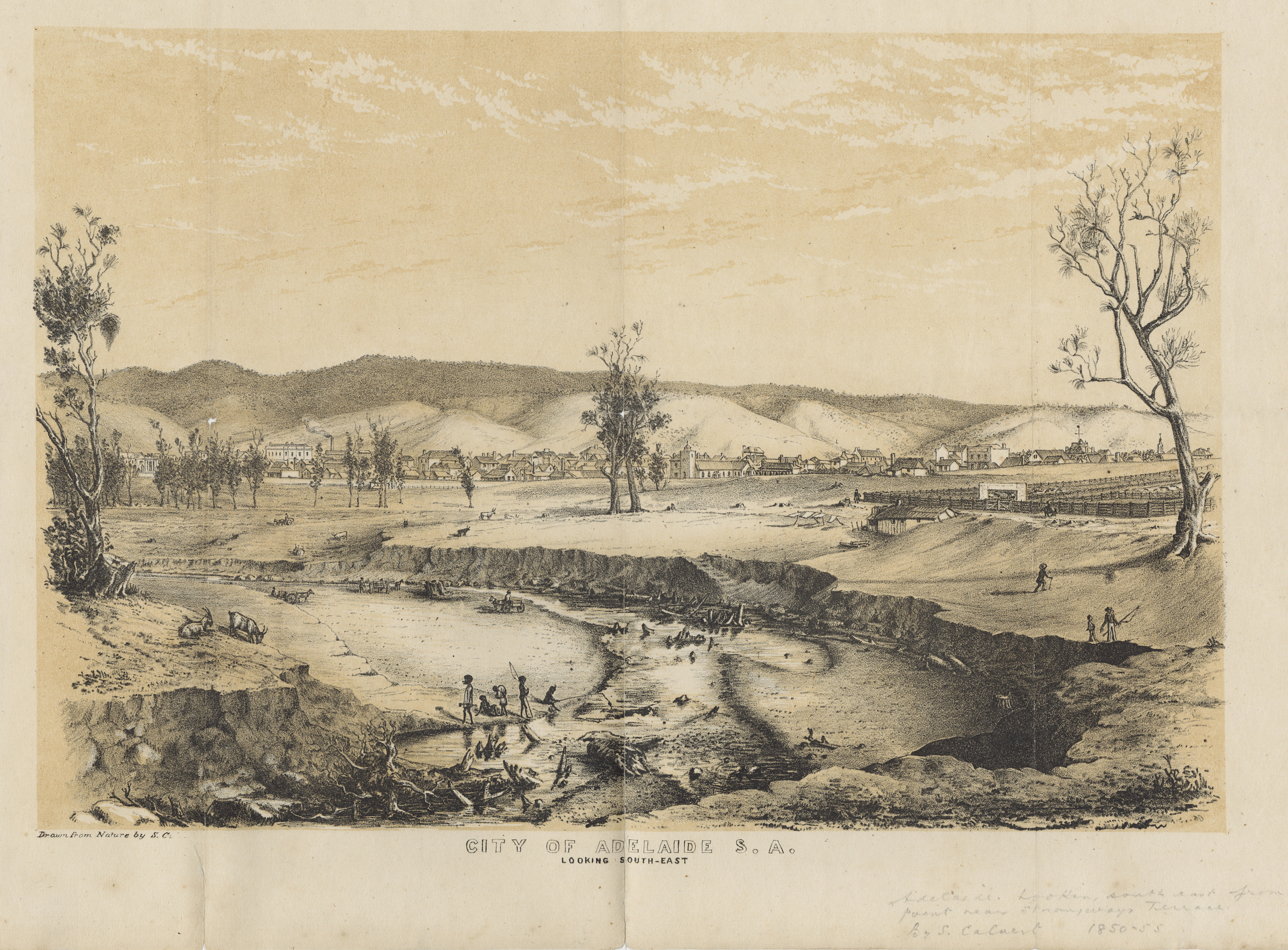
'City of Adelaide S.A. looking south-east' (tinted lithograph print) by Samuel Calvert, offered free to subscribers of the Monthly Almanac.

In 1843 Calvert's older brothers, John and William, migrated to the colony of South Australia. In 1848, influenced by his brothers' immigration experience, Samuel Calvert resigned from his job as a clerk for the East India Company in London and sailed for Adelaide aboard the Symmetry, arriving on 9 November 1848. He initially found employment at George Dehane's printery in King William Street. In February 1850 the first edition of the Monthly Almanac and Illustrated Commentator was published, with Calvert as a co-proprietor and providing illustrations for the periodical. The publication was described as "an experiment in light literature, purely of a local character" and an imitation of the English Punch magazine. Advertisements for the April 1850 edition of the Monthly Almanac offered a tinted lithograph print by Calvert, 'City of Adelaide S.A. looking south-east', "gratis to all persons paying five months' subscription in advance". The print featured a view of the River Torrens in the foreground, depicting a group of Aborigines fishing in the river, and a view of the early settlement of Adelaide and the Mount Lofty Ranges in the background.^{[A]} The Monthly Almanac was short-lived, its last edition being published in July 1850. By September 1850 Calvert had entered into partnership with Alfred Waddy; they conducted the Artists' Repository in King William Street, producing prints and maps and selling artists' supplies. By October they had enlarged their premises to incorporate a bookbinding service. As well as illustrative work for publications and art reproductions, Calvert produced wood engravings for billheads and advertisements.

In January 1851 Alfred Waddy purchased Calvert's interest in the Artists' Repository. The reason for Calvert leaving the partnership was to enable him to work exclusively as a draftsman and engraver "in consequence of the now rapidly increasing demand for ichnographic and artistic illustration".

Samuel Calvert and Emma Lake were married in about 1851 in Adelaide.

On 24 January 1852 Calvert left Adelaide for Melbourne aboard the Asia.

=== Melbourne ===
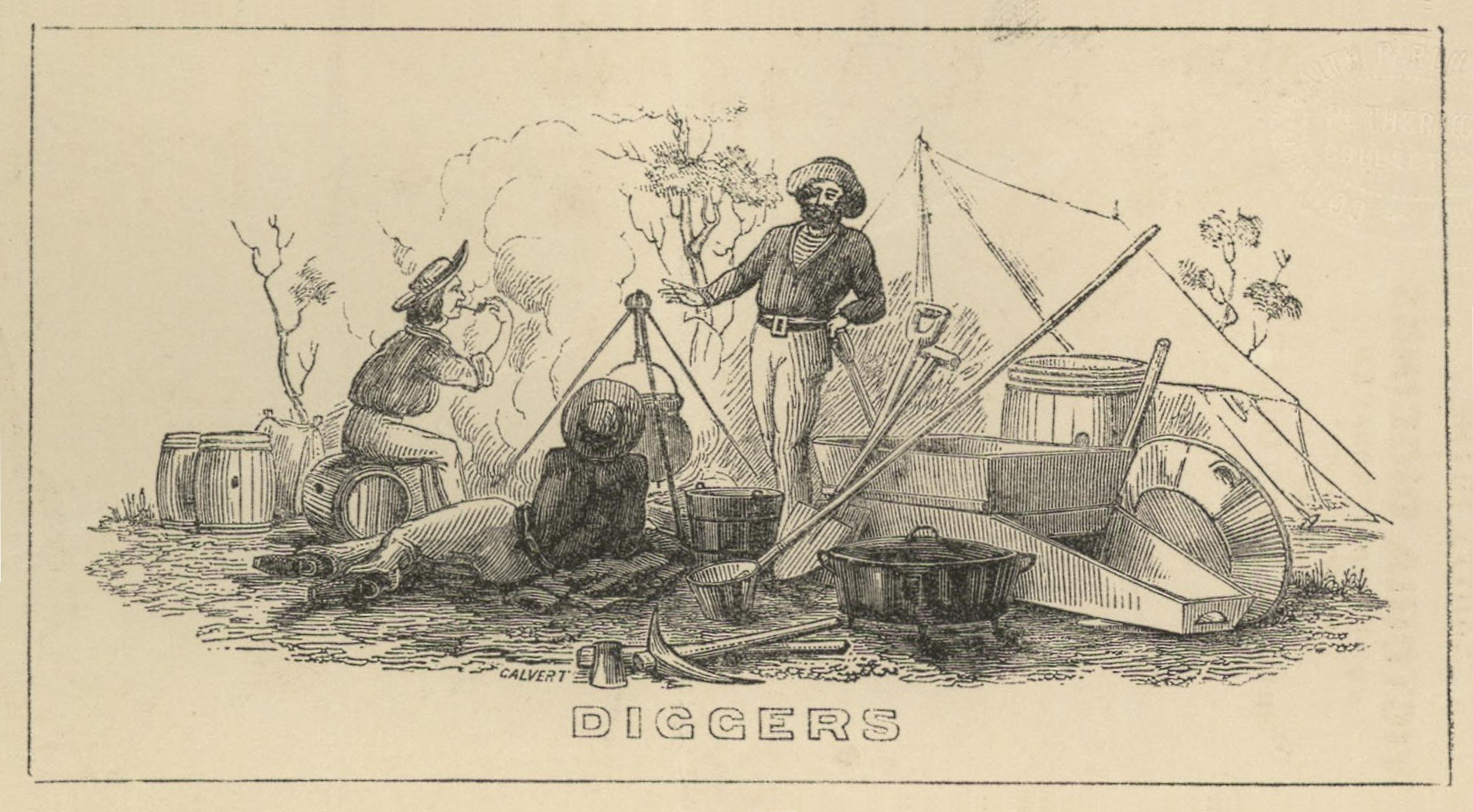
'Diggers' by Calvert, the frontispiece of James Bonwick's Notes of a Gold Digger and Gold Diggers' Guide, published in 1852.

Soon after his arrival in Melbourne Calvert produced two illustrations for James Bonwick's Notes of a Gold Digger and Gold Diggers' Guide, published in Melbourne in 1852. His contributions were a map, 'Routes to the Victoria Diggings', and a frontispiece depicting a group of diggers around a camp-fire, surrounded by mining equipment. In Melbourne Calvert resumed work as an artist and wood-engraver, providing illustrations for books and advertisements and for the illustrated monthly magazine The Arm-Chair. The Arm-Chair was first published in about September 1853 by Hough & Co. It was described as "an amusing little publication... the Punch of Melbourne", containing "sparkling and witty" writing and "clever wood engravings". In March 1853 Calvert's portrait of the racehorse Balaarat, "winner of the Town Plate", was published.

In 1854 Calvert commenced a printing business with his older brother William. The firm of Calvert Brothers were initially located in Lonsdale Street. By mid-1855 they had moved to premises in Brunswick Street in Collingwood, but by the following November the business had relocated nearer to the centre of Melbourne at 24 Collins Street West. As engravers, lithographers and draughtsmen, they produced and contributed to various illustrated periodicals and specialty publications such as Melbourne Punch, first published in August 1855, and Australian Home Companion and Illustrated Weekly Magazine, first published in October 1856. Calvert provided illustrations for Victoria Illustrated, published by Messrs. Sands and Kenny in December 1856, described as "a handsomely bound volume of engravings illustrative of the scenery of Victoria". The Calvert Brothers partnership also published the illustrated periodicals Australian Builder and Weekly Remembrancer as well as local almanacs. In February 1858 Calvert received a certificate of merit at the Victorian Industrial Society's exhibition for "specimens of engraving on Huon pine wood, and specimens of electrotype".

=== Postage stamps ===
In 1854 Samuel Calvert successfully tendered for the engraving and printing of Victorian postage stamps. In June 1854 a contract was signed with the Victorian Post Office specifying the production of one million stamps, in sheets of fifty, for which Calvert would be paid £275. He continued to engrave and print postage stamps from 1854 to 1857 under a number of contractual arrangements with the Post Office. In late-1857 and early-1858 2,500 sheets of stamps were returned to Calvert for gumming and perforation. During this period Calvert was experiencing financial difficulties, being owed progress payments from the Post Office for work already completed. On nine occasions during January to March 1858 he took sheets of fourpenny and sixpenny stamps to the pawnbrokers, Messrs. Cohen and Marks, and received advances of money against the value of the stamps. In late March Calvert was visited by a detective and subsequently charged with obtaining money under false pretenses.

On 31 March 1858 Samuel Calvert was brought before a Bench of Magistrates and charged with "embezzling money, and illegally disposing of stamps, the property of the Government". After witnesses gave evidence detailing the circumstances of the transactions, Calvert was committed for trial and released under his own recognizance and two sureties. Calvert was tried on April 20 before Justice Molesworth, charged with "having, on the 25th March, detained certain postage-stamps, the property of Her Majesty, with frauduent intent". He pleaded not guilty. In addressing the jury towards the end of the trial Calvert's attorney, Dr. Sewell, "referred to the well-known good character of his client, who had committed the error with no evil intent, but under the pressure of pecuniary difficulties". After considering the matter for half an hour the jury returned a verdict of guilty "accompanied by a strong recommendation to mercy on account of previous good character". Calvert was sentenced to three months' imprisonment, but was allowed a period on bail in order for him to "settle his affairs".

After the trial bankruptcy proceedings were begun against Calvert and on 29 May 1858 his assets was placed under sequestration. In August 1858 he appeared in the Insolvent Court where it was revealed that the three-month sentence passed on him had "not been carried into effect, in consequence of a reserved point" and in all probability "it will be quashed". At the third meeting before the Insolvent Court on 13 September 1858 Calvert disclosed that, although he had a claim against the Post Office for £180, the debt "is so mixed up with contingencies as to the payment, that the assignee has serious doubts of its being paid". Calvert was granted a certificate of discharge from insolvency in July 1859.

=== Revived career ===
After being discharged from bankruptcy Samuel Calvert began to rebuild his career as an artist and wood-engraver, working either from home or as an employee of an established printing business. In September 1862 Calvert had a personal setback when his wife Emma died, aged about 31 years. The couple had five children, four daughters and a son, born between 1852 and 1861.

In 1865 Calvert had a two-storey studio constructed at the rear of his home in 41 George Street, Fitzroy. The design was notable for the generous provision of lighting from the south on the upper floor. In 1867 Calvert set up commercially as a wood-engraver once again, his premises located at 87 Little Collins Street East (close to William Calvert's printery in the same street). He remained at that location until 1886. His principal work was in connection with the illustrated newspapers of Melbourne, specifically the Melbourne Post and afterwards The Illustrated Australian News for Home Readers. Calvert continued to produce engraved illustrations throughout the 1860s, 1870s and 1880s, published in the range of Melbourne illustrated newspapers and periodicals as well as for publications in other Australian colonies. Examples of his engraved images can be found in Melbourne Punch, The Illustrated Journal of Australasia, Illustrated Newsletter of Australasia, Illustrated Melbourne Post, Australasian Sketcher, The Illustrated Australian News and Illustrated New Zealand Herald.

In June 1869 Calvert's thirteen-year-old daughter, Caroline, died of "consumption" (tuberculosis).

Samuel Calvert was one of the founding members of the Victorian Academy of Art, formed in 1870 (later renamed the Victorian Artists' Society). He was elected to the council of the academy in April 1872. Calvert regularly exhibited watercolours and oil paintings at the academy's exhibitions during the mid-1870s and early 1880s.

The brothers, Samuel and William Calvert, provided encouragement and assisted the young inventor, Louis Brennan, during the design, testing and manufacture of his guided torpedo. Such was William's faith in the invention that he provided initial capital to develop the torpedo. Brennan's invention was tested in Hobson's Bay in 1879, "its test performances exciting wonder and approbation". In about 1881 William Calvert and Louis Brennan took the invention to England where Brennan eventually succeeded in selling his invention to the British Admiralty.

In about 1886 Calvert's son, William Samuel Calvert, joined his father's business at 85 Little Collins Street East. In general, William took responsibility for the engraving work while Samuel Calvert worked as the artist of the business.

Samuel Calvert returned to England in 1888, remaining there for about six years. During this period W. S. Calvert took over his father's printing business in Melbourne. In England Calvert wrote A Memoir of Edward Calvert, Artist, by his Third Son, a volume commemorating his late father, which was published in London in 1893 in an edition of 250 copies. In 1894 Calvert returned to Melbourne and leased a building at 92-94 Collins Street (a location associated with artists since the mid-1860s), where he opened the Burlington Studios in November 1894. Calvert put together an initial exhibition and sale of watercolour drawings and sketches he had collected in England. In the early morning of 9 May 1895 a fire broke out in the building where the Burlington Studios was located, completely gutting the structure. Paintings destroyed in the fire were by French and English artists, as well as some by "old Italian masters". A painting "of a Greek Pastoral" by Calvert's father Edward, which had been exhibited at the Royal Academy, was also destroyed. Calvert estimated his losses at about £1,500, which were partly covered by insurance.

=== Return to England ===
In 1904 or 1905 Calvert again returned to England, where he remained until his death.

Samuel Calvert died on 1 January 1913 at Crowthorne, county Berkshire, England, aged 84 years.

== Gallery ==
A selection of engraved images by Samuel Calvert
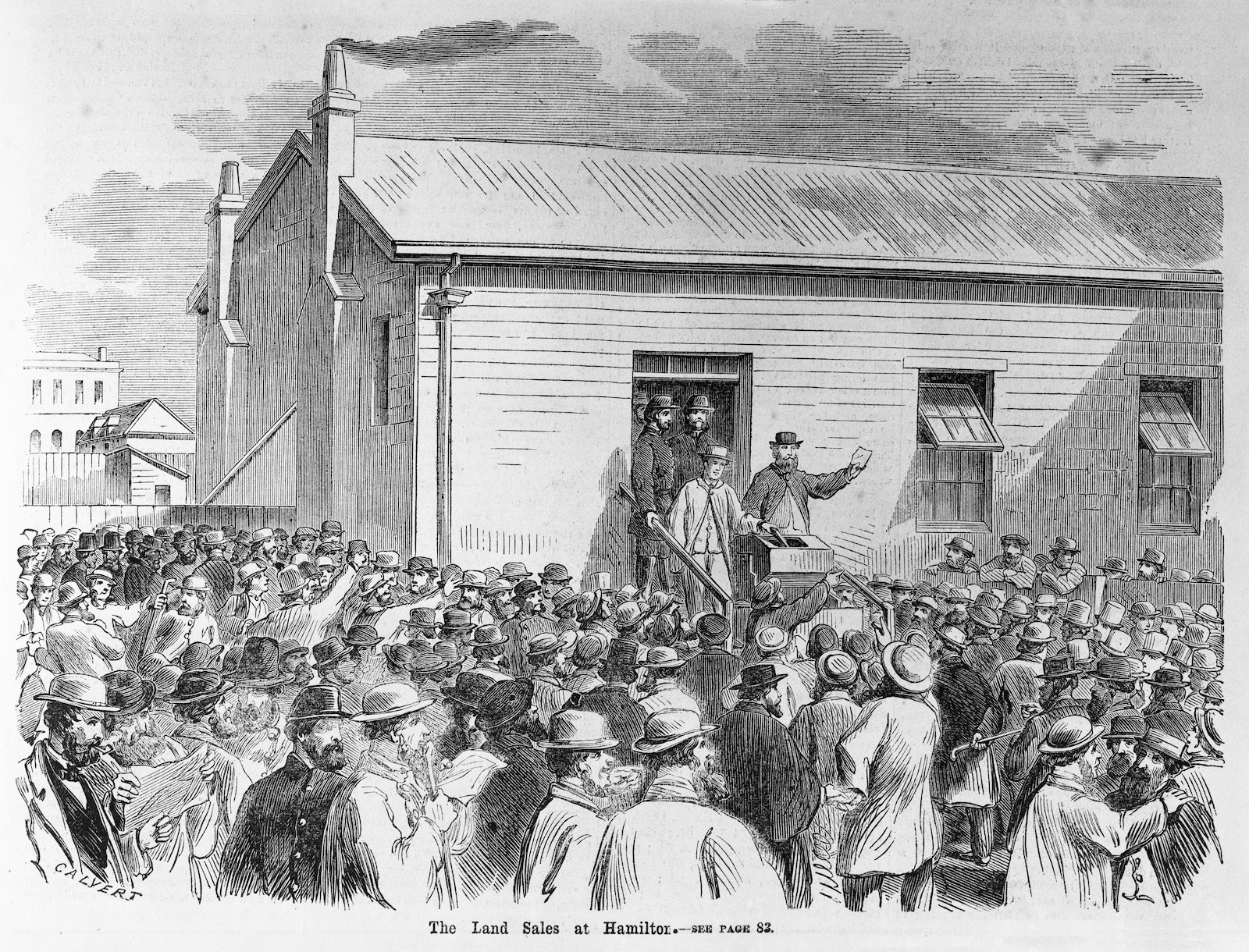
'The land sales at Hamilton' (published 24 June 1865).

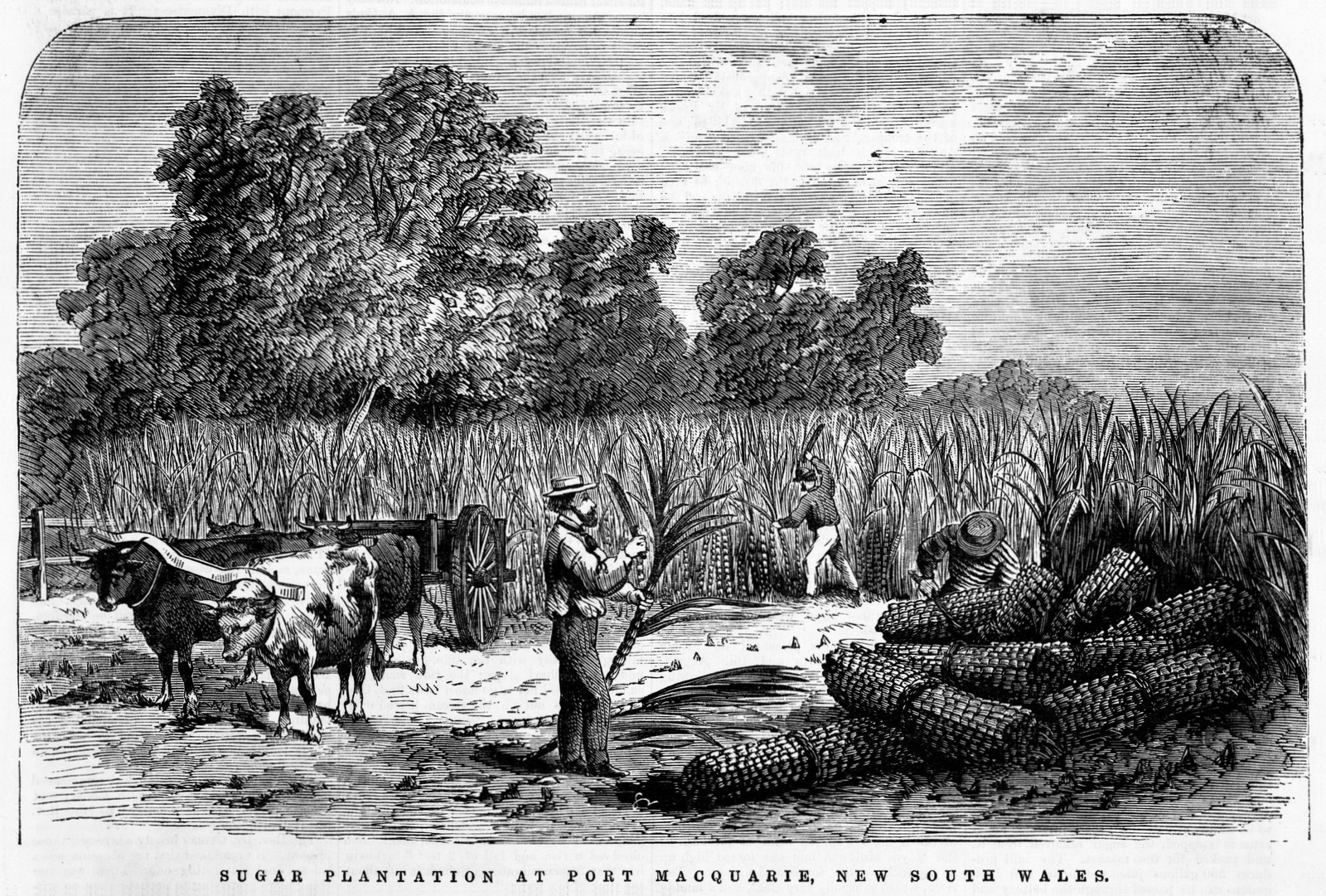
'Sugar Plantation at Port Macquarie, New South Wales' (published 5 September 1868).

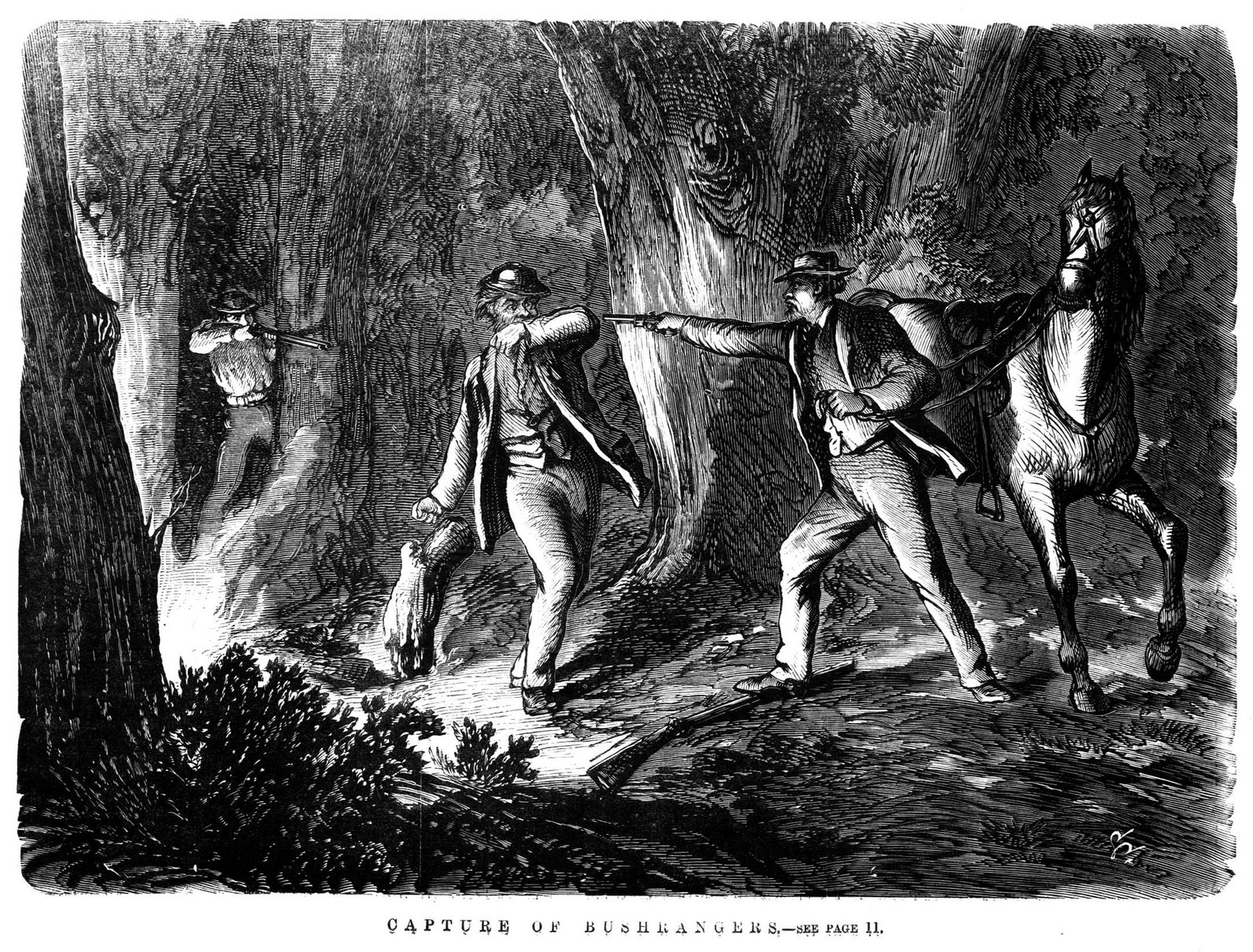
'Capture of Bushrangers' (published 2 January 1871).

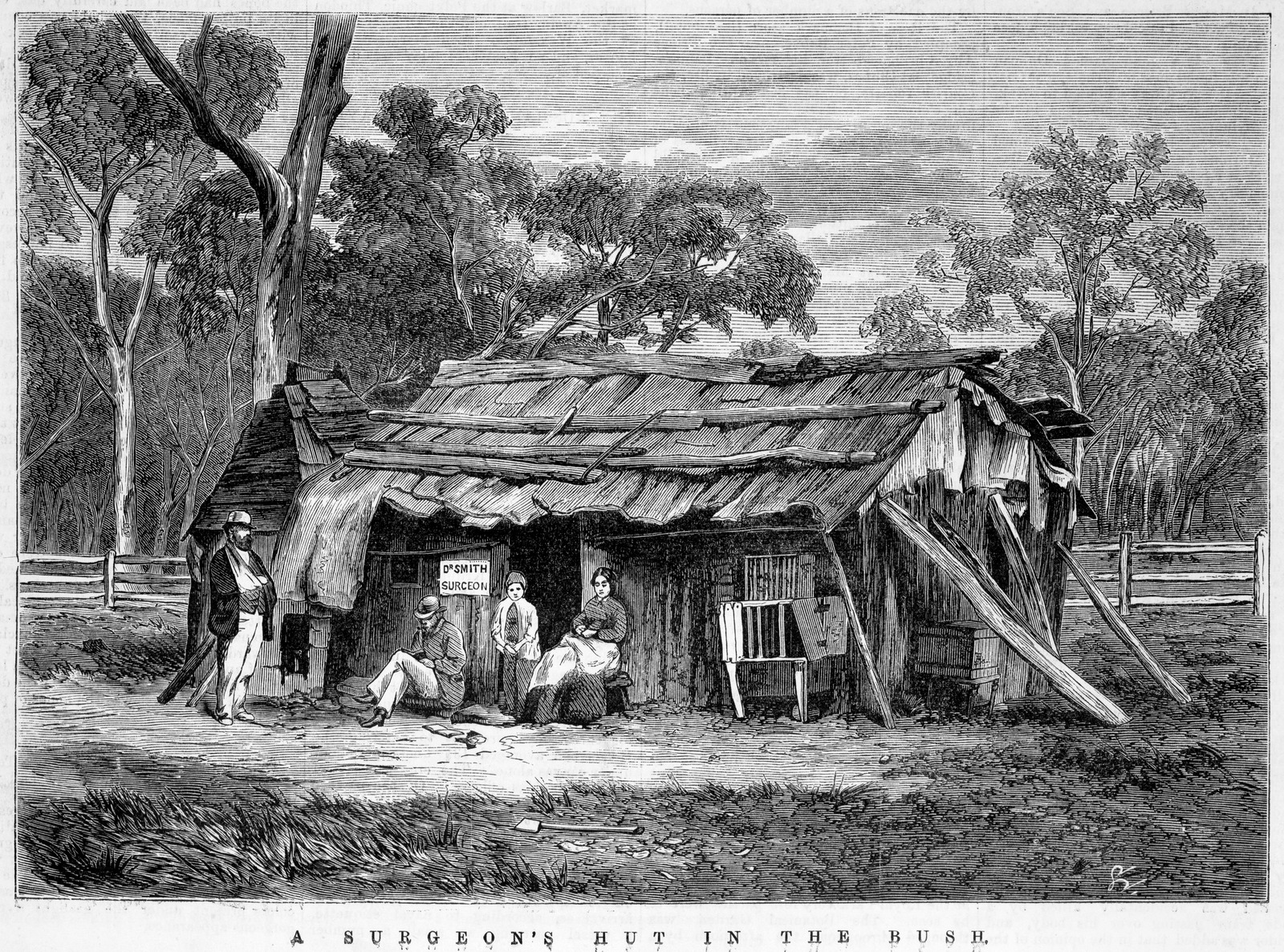
'A Surgeon's Hut in the Bush' (published 22 April 1873).

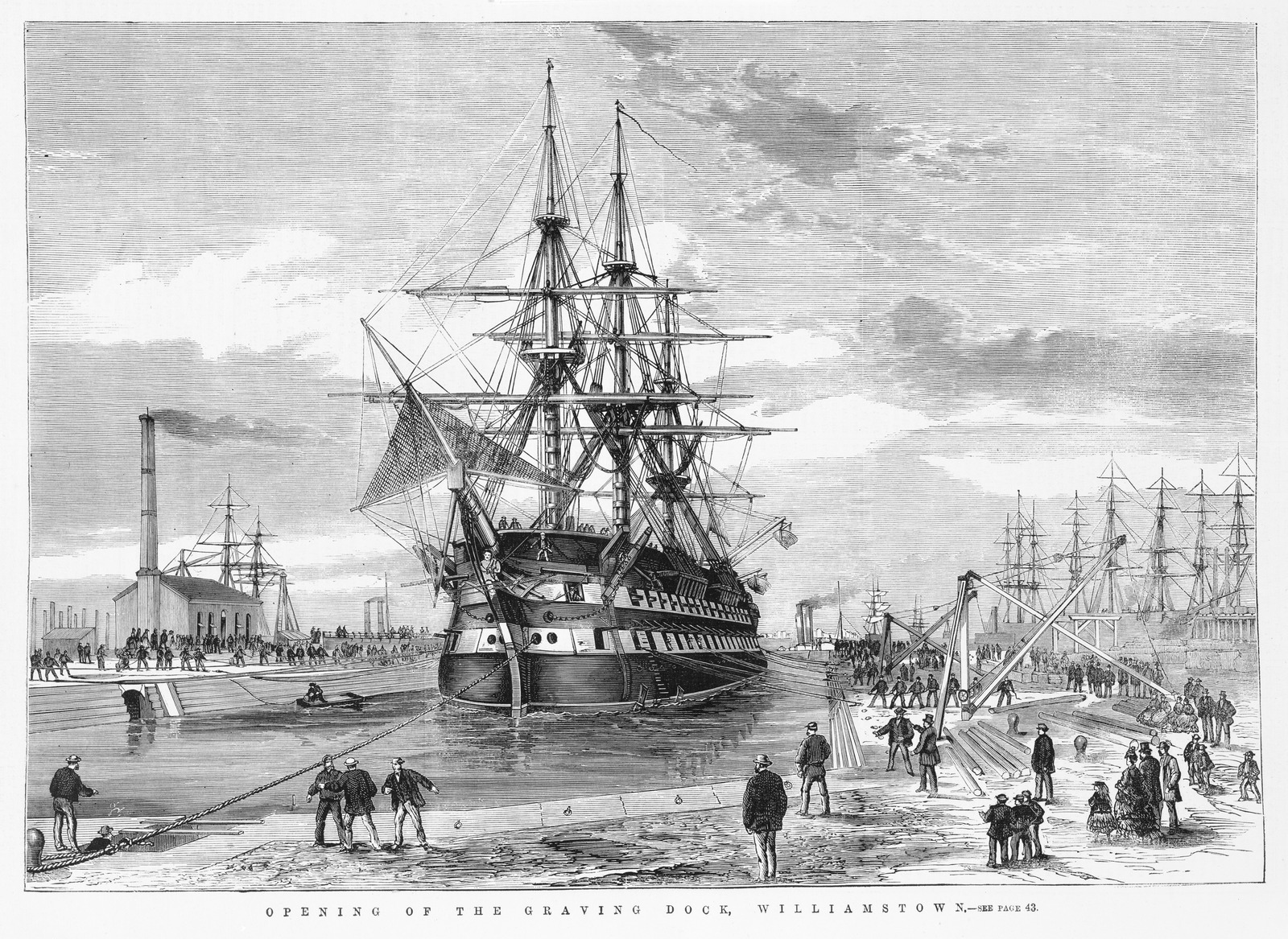
'Opening of the Graving Dock, Williamstown' (published 25 March 1874).

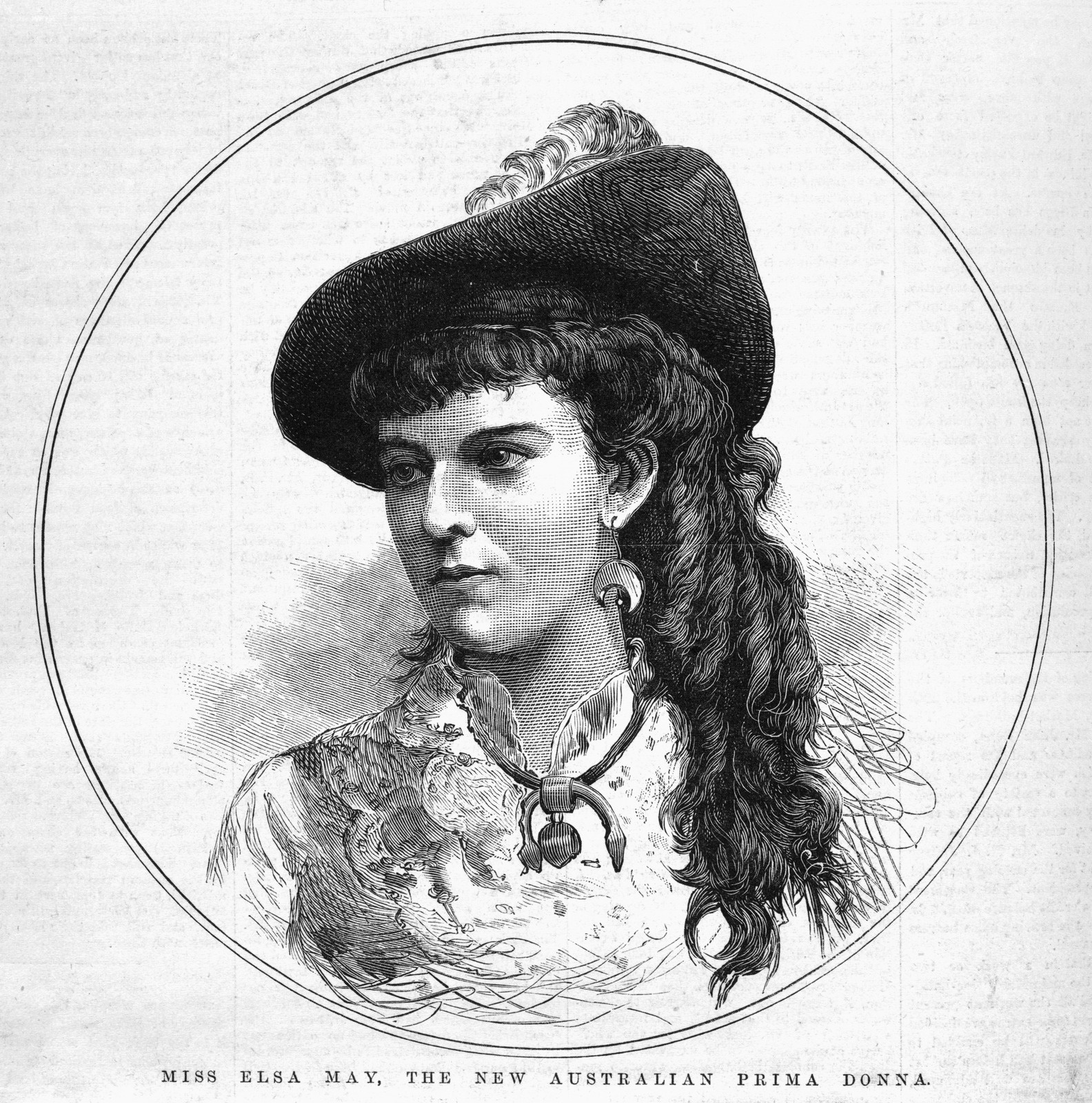
'Miss Elsa May, the New Australian Prima Donna' (published 8 May 1880).

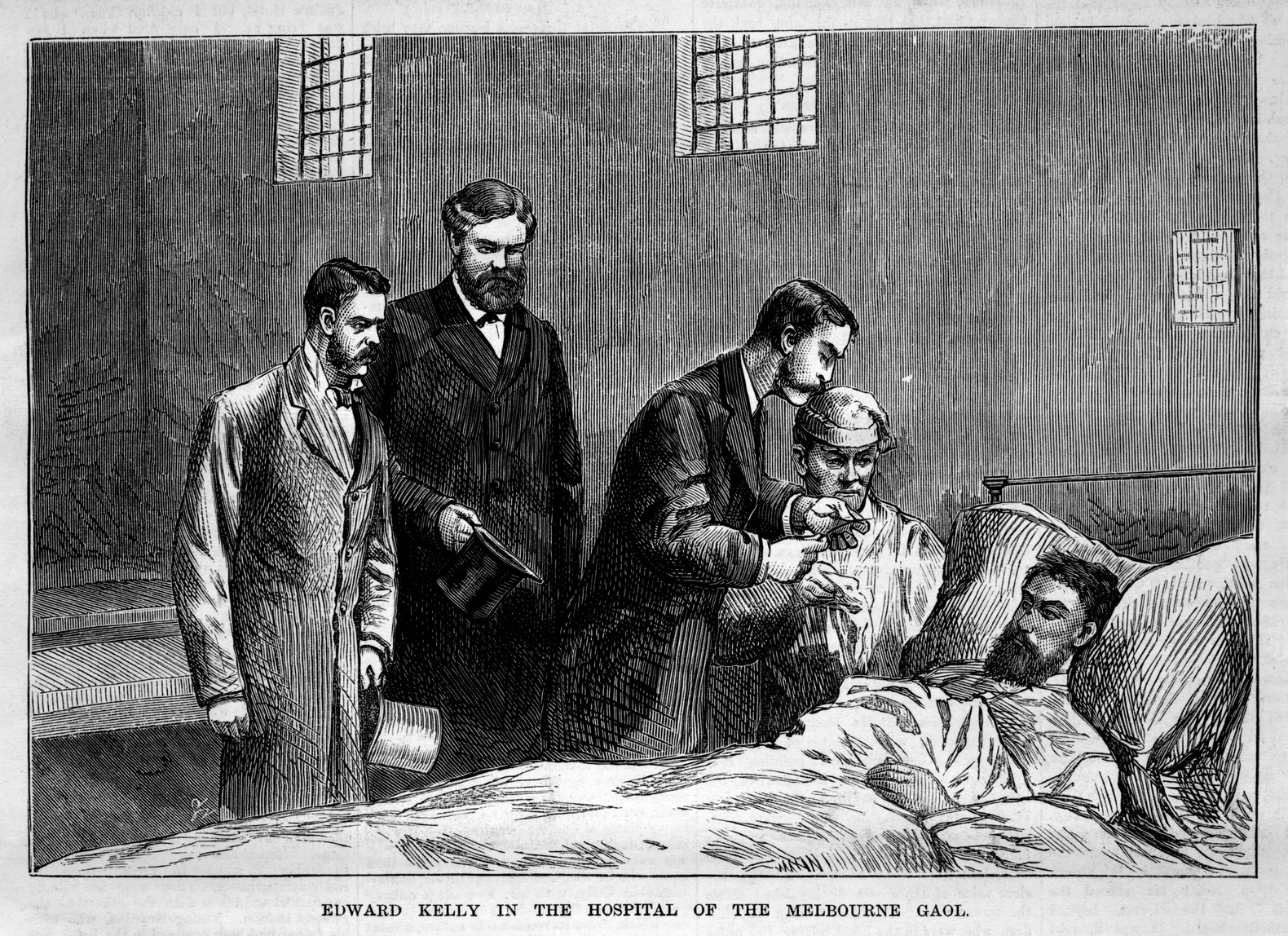
'Edward Kelly in the Hospital of the Melbourne Gaol' (published 17 July 1880).

== Notes ==
A.The original watercolour painting, on which the lithographic print 'City of Adelaide S.A. looking south-east' was based, is a part of the collection of the Art Gallery of South Australia. The gallery also has in its collection Calvert's 'View of Port Adelaide Regatta and the North Arm' (pencil and watercolour on paper). Both these paintings date from 1850.
