= Frederick Tatham =

English painter

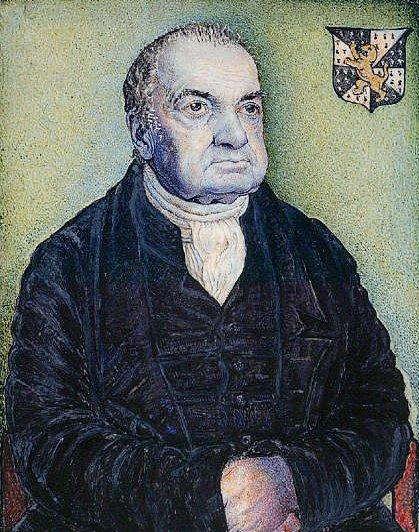
Portrait of William Williams (c 1828) by Tatham, imitating the style of Hans Holbein

Frederick Tatham (31 July 1805 – 29 July 1878) was an English artist who was a member of the Shoreham Ancients, a group of followers of William Blake.

The son of Charles Heathcote Tatham, an architect, Tatham and his brother and sister were all associated with the Ancients. His sister Julia married another member, George Richmond, the father of William Blake Richmond.

Tatham is most notable because after Blake's death, he looked after the poet's widow Catherine, who nominally worked as his housekeeper. After her death in 1831, he claimed that she had left him all her husband’s works. This claim brought him into conflict with another Ancient, John Linnell, who insisted that Blake's sister should have inherited them. Tatham also tried to extract paintings that Linnell himself owned, though Linnell had bought them from the artist.

Shortly afterwards, Tatham joined a millenarian sect, becoming an Irvingite (follower of Edward Irving). At this time his religious dogmatism led him to destroy a significant number of Blake's works in the belief that they had been inspired by the devil. Tatham later wrote biographical literature on Blake.

Tatham was both a sculptor and painter, exhibiting at the Royal Academy between 1825 and 1854. His works were characterised by their imitation of stiff early Renaissance styles, in the manner of the Ancients, though his later work became more conventional.

Frederick Tatham died at age 72 in his home at 45 Oak Village in the Kentish Town area of Northwest London.
