= John Birch (surgeon) =

English surgeon

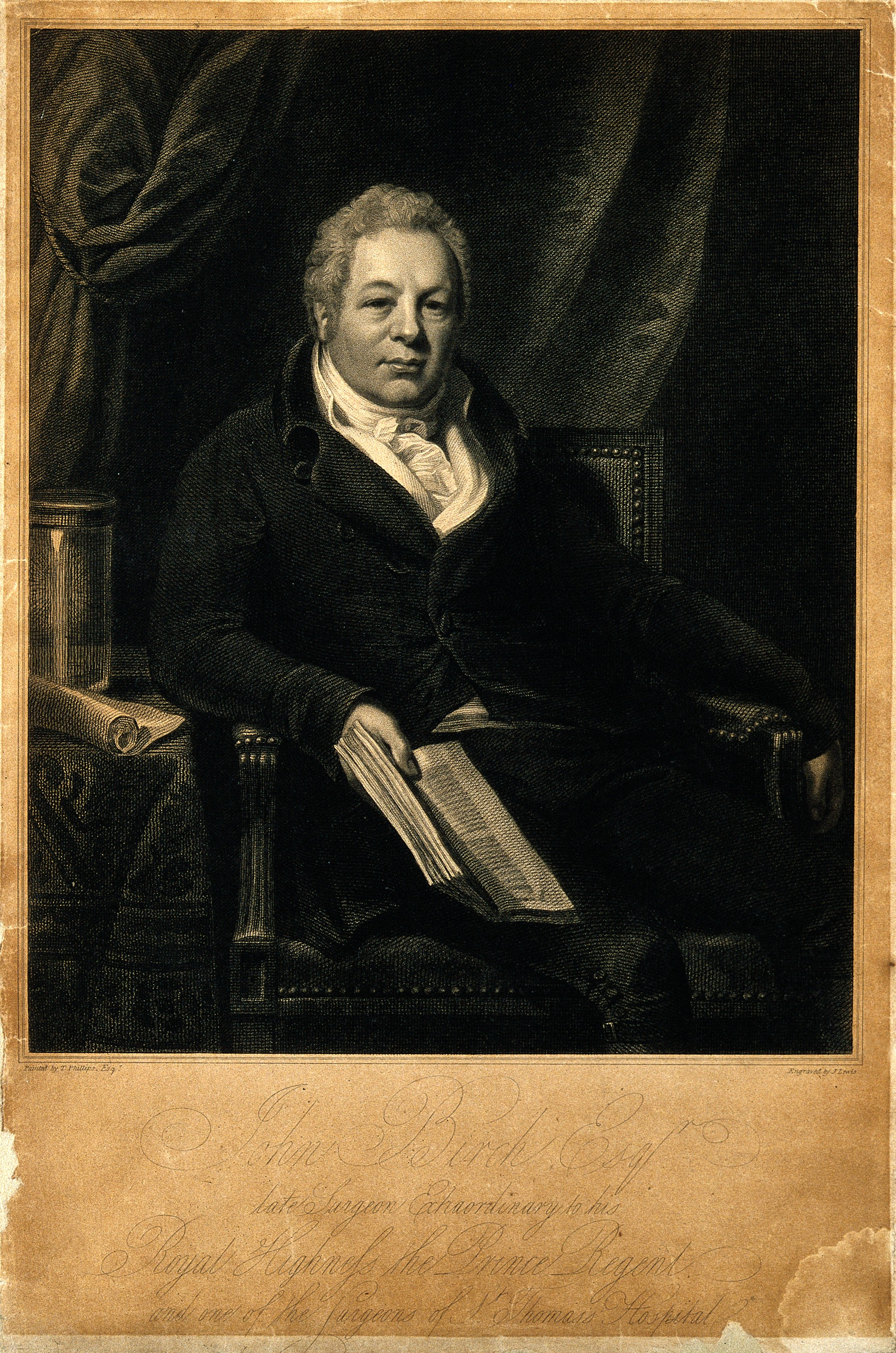
- Died: 3 February 1815; London
- Occupations: Surgeon, writer

John Birch (1745? – 3 February 1815) was an English surgeon, anti-vaccination activist and medical writer.

== Biography ==
Birch was born in 1745 or 1746, but where cannot now be traced. He served some years as a surgeon in the army, and afterwards settled in London. He was elected on 12 May 1784 surgeon to St. Thomas's Hospital, and held office till his death. He was also surgeon extraordinary to the prince regent. Birch was a surgeon of much repute in his day, both in hospital and private practice, but was chiefly known for his enthusiastic advocacy of electricity as a remedial agent, and for his equally ardent opposition to the introduction of vaccination. He served the cause of medical electricity by founding an electrical department at St. Thomas's Hospital, and carrying it on with much energy. For more than twenty-one years, he says, he performed the manipulations himself, since he found it difficult to induce the students to take much interest in the subject. The kind of electricity employed was exclusively the frictional, which is now known to be of little use, the therapeutical value of galvanism being not at that time understood. Nevertheless, his writings on the subject, which were widely circulated both in this country and abroad, must have done much in keeping alive professional interest in investigations which have turned out to be remarkably fruitful in practical results.

Birch died on 3 February 1815 and was buried in the church in Rood Lane, Fenchurch Street, where a monument was erected to his memory by his sister Penelope Birch.

== Anti-vaccination ==
Birch was an anti-vaccinationist who opposed vaccination for Malthusian and medical reasons. He published pamphlets in opposition to the practice of vaccination, and advocated variolation to prevent and friction electricity to cure smallpox.

He also gave evidence before a committee of the House of Commons in the same sense, his objections have no longer much scientific interest, but the point of view from which he regarded the subject is represented in his monumental epitaph, as follows: "The practice of cow-poxing, which first became general in his day, undaunted by the overwhelming influence of power and prejudice, and by the voice of nations, he uniformly and until death perseveringly opposed, conscientiously believing it to be a public infatuation, fraught with peril of the most mischievous consequences to mankind."

Birch has been cited as one of the first physicians to oppose vaccination and his arguments that vaccines are dangerous, ineffective and can cause the disease that it is intended to prevent or other diseases are the same arguments that modern day anti-vaxxers use.

== Publications ==
Birch wrote: 1. 'Considerations on the Efficacy of Electricity in removing Female Obstructions,' London, 1779, 8vo; 4th edition 1798 (translated into German). 2. 'A Letter on Medical Electricity,' published in George Adams's 'Essay on Electricity,' London, 1798, 4to (4th edition); also separately, 1792, 8vo. 3. 'An Essay on the Medical Applications of Electricity,' 1802, 8vo (translated into German, Italian, and Russian). 4. 'Pharmacopœia Chirurgica in usum nosocomii Londinensis S. Thomæ,' London, 1803. 12mo. 5. 'A Letter occasioned by the many failures of the Cow-pox,' addressed to W. R. Rogers. Published in the latter writer's 'Examination of Evidence relative to Cow-pox delivered to the Committee of the House of Commons by two of the Surgeons of St. Thomas's Hospital,' 2nd edition, 1805. 6. 'Serious Reasons for objecting to the Practice of Vaccination. In answer to the Report of the Jennerian Society,' 1806, 8vo. 7. 'Copy of an Answer to the Queries of the London College of Surgeons and of a Letter to the College of Physicians respecting the Cow-pox,' 1807, 8vo. The last two were reprinted by Penelope Birch, with the title 'An Appeal to the Public on the Hazard and Peril of Vaccination, otherwise Cow-pox,' 1817, 8vo. 8. 'The Fatal Effects of Cow-pox Protection,' 1808, 12mo (anonymous, but ascribed to Birch in the 'Dict. of Living Authors,' 1816). 9. 'A Report of the True State of the Experiment of Cow-pox,' 1810 (on the same authority).
