= Samuel Palmer =

English painter

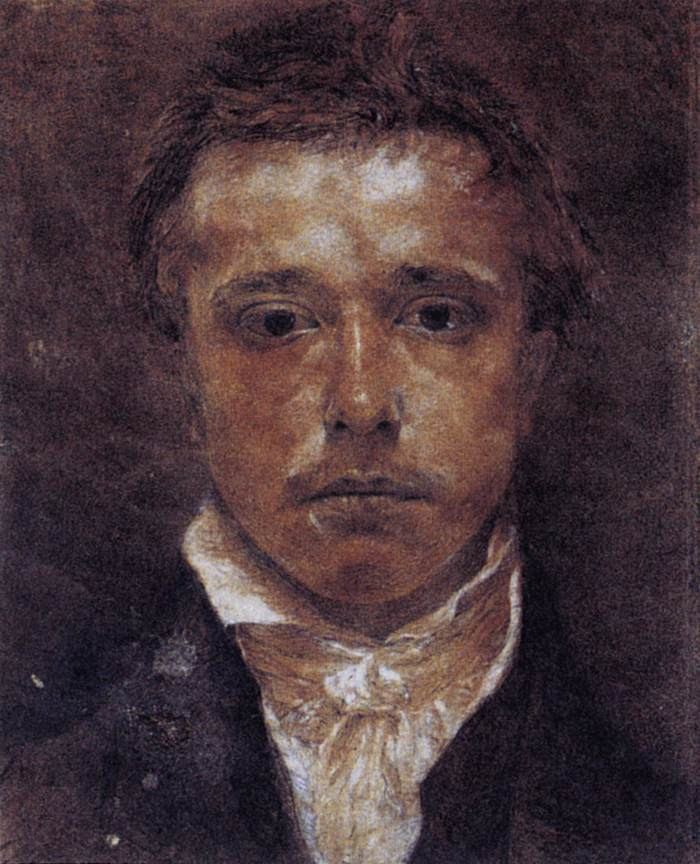
- Self portrait, c.1826
- Born: Samuel Palmer; 27 January 1805; London, England
- Died: 24 May 1881 (aged 76); Redhill, Surrey, England
- Known for: Painting, printmaking, drawing,
- Notable work: Garden in Shoreham,
- Movement: The Ancients

Samuel Palmer RWS Hon.RE (Hon. Fellow of the Society of Painter-Etchers) (27 January 1805 – 24 May 1881) was a British landscape painter, etcher and printmaker. He was also a prolific writer. Palmer was a key figure in Romanticism in Britain and produced visionary pastoral paintings.

== Early life ==
Palmer, who was born in Surrey Square off the Old Kent Road in Newington, London (now Walworth), was the son of Samuel Palmer, a bookseller and sometime Baptist minister and Martha (nee Giles), but was raised by a pious nurse, Mary Ward. Palmer painted churches from around age twelve, and first exhibited Turner-inspired works at the Royal Academy at the age of fourteen. He had little formal training, and little formal schooling, although he was educated briefly at Merchant Taylors' School. On 18 January 1818, Palmer's mother, Martha, died suddenly, an event that affected the young Palmer for the rest of his life. He wrote "It was like a sharp sword sent through the length of me".

== Shoreham ==
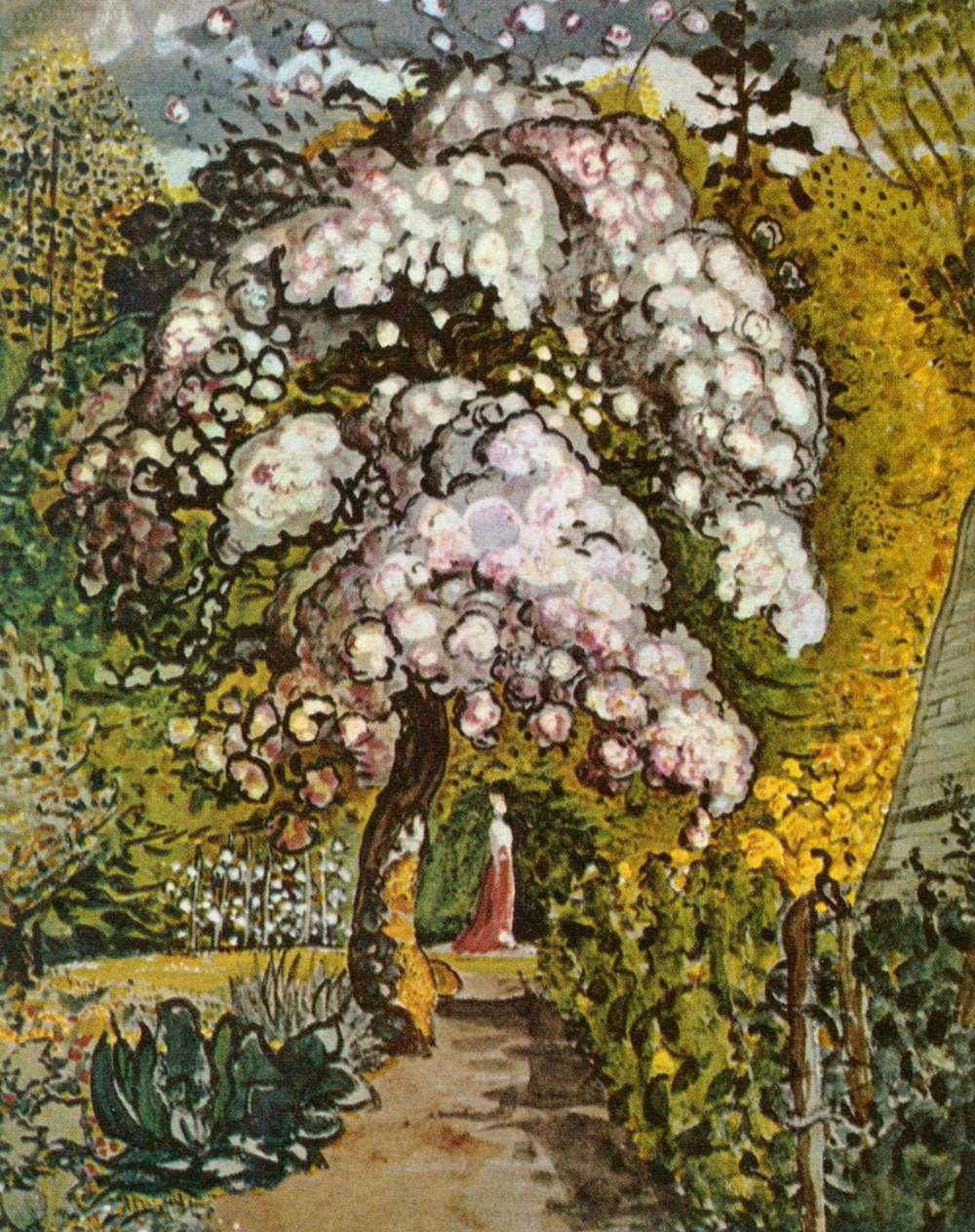
In a Shoreham Garden (1820s or early 1830s)

Through John Linnell, he met William Blake in 1824. Blake's influence can be seen in work he produced over the next ten years. The works were landscapes around Shoreham, near Sevenoaks in the west of Kent. He purchased a run-down cottage, nicknamed "Rat Abbey", and lived there from 1826 to 1835, depicting the area as a demi-paradise, mysterious and visionary, often shown in sepia shades under moon and star light. There Palmer associated with a group of Blake-influenced artists known as the Ancients (including George Richmond and Edward Calvert). They were among the few who saw the Shoreham paintings as, resulting from attacks by critics in 1825, he opened his early portfolios only to selected friends.

Palmer's somewhat disreputable father – Samuel Palmer senior – moved to the area, his brother Nathaniel having offered him an allowance that would "make him a gentleman" and restore the good name of the family. Samuel Palmer senior rented half of the Queen Anne-era 'Waterhouse' which still stands by the River Darent at Shoreham and is now known as the 'Water House'. Palmer's nurse, Mary Ward, and his other son William joined him there. The Waterhouse was used to accommodate overflow guests from "Rat Abbey". In 1828 Samuel Palmer left "Rat Abbey" to join his father at Water House and lived there for the rest of his time in Shoreham. While at Shoreham he fell in love with the fourteen-year-old Hannah Linnell, whom he later married.

== Maturity ==
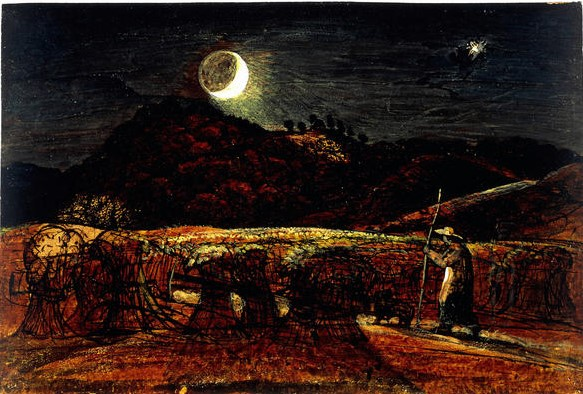
A Cornfield by Moonlight with the Evening Star (c.1830)

After returning to London in 1835, and using a legacy to purchase a house in Marylebone, Palmer produced less mystical and more conventional work. Part of his reason in returning to London was to sell his work and earn money from private teaching. He had better health on his return to London, and was by then married to Hannah, daughter of the painter John Linnell whom he had known since she was a child, and married when she was nineteen and he was thirty-two. He sketched in Devonshire and Wales around this time. His peaceful vision of rural England had been disrupted by the violent rural discontent of the early 1830s. His small financial legacy was running out and he decided to produce work more in line with public taste if he was to earn an income for himself and his wife. He was following the advice of his father-in-law. Linnell, who had earlier shown remarkable understanding of the uniqueness of William Blake's genius, was not as generous with his son-in-law, towards whom his attitude was authoritarian and often harsh.

Palmer turned more to watercolour which was gaining popularity in England. To further a commercial career, the couple embarked on a two-year honeymoon to Italy, made possible by money from Hannah's parents in 1837. In Italy Palmer's palette became brighter, sometimes to the point of garishness, but he made many fine sketches and studies that would later be useful in producing new paintings. On his return to London, Palmer sought patrons with limited success. For more than two decades he was obliged to work as a private drawing master, until he moved from London in 1862. To add to his financial worries, he returned to London to find his dissolute brother William had pawned all his early paintings, and Palmer was obliged to pay a large sum to redeem them. By all accounts Palmer was an excellent teacher, but the work with students reduced the time he could devote to his own art.

== Later years ==
From the early 1860s he gained some measure of critical success for his later landscapes, which had a touch of the early Shoreham work about them – most notable is the etching of The Lonely Tower (1879). He became a full member of the Water Colour Society in 1854, and its annual show gave him a yearly goal to work towards.

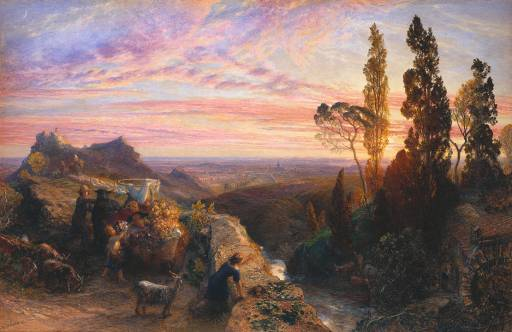
A Dream in the Apennine (c.1864)

His best late works include a series of large watercolours illustrating Milton's poems L'Allegro and Il Penseroso and his etchings, a medium in which he worked from 1850 onwards, including a set illustrating Virgil.

Palmer's later years were darkened by the death in 1861, at the age of 19, of his elder son Thomas More Palmer – a devastating blow from which he never fully recovered. He lived in various places later in his life, including a small cottage and an unaffordable villa both in Kensington, where he lived at 6 Douro Place, then a cottage at Reigate. But it was only when a small measure of financial security came his way, that was he able to move to Furze Hill House in Redhill, Surrey, from 1862. He could not afford to have a daily newspaper delivered to Redhill, suggesting that his financial circumstances there were still tight.

Palmer died in Redhill, Surrey, and is buried with his wife in St Mary's, Reigate churchyard.

== Legacy ==
=== Surge in the 1960s ===
Palmer was largely forgotten after his death. In 1909, many of his Shoreham works were destroyed by his surviving son Alfred Herbert Palmer, who burnt "a great quantity of father's handiwork ... Knowing that no one would be able to make head or tail of what I burnt; I wished to save it from a more humiliating fate". The destruction included "sketchbooks, notebooks, and original works, and lasted for days". Interest in his work was rekindled in 1926 by a show curated by Martin Hardie at the Victoria & Albert Museum: Drawings, Etchings and Woodcuts made by Samuel Palmer and other Disciples of William Blake. In the ensuing decades, the publication of two important books and the presentation of another London exhibition combined to trigger a surge in his popularity: Geoffrey Grigson's, Samuel Palmer: The Visionary Years (280 pages, with 68 photo illustrations, 1947), the Arts Council of Great Britain’s 1956-57 exhibition: Samuel Palmer and his circle - The Shoreham period, and Grigson's follow-up, Samuel Palmer's Valley of Vision (forty-eight plates, a selection of Palmer's writings, 1960). In the 1930s, the maximum price a Shoreham period drawing brought was around £50. Three sold in the early 1960s — Weald of Kent, The Evening Star, and Cow Lodge with a Mossy Roof — for £6000, £5200, and £7200. Leger Gallery purchased the diminutive watercolour The Golden Valley in 1969 for £14,000. In a 2003 auction at Christie’s, it brought £587,650.

The renewed popularity of his Shoreham work influenced a succession of English artists, notably F. L. Griggs, Robin Tanner, Graham Sutherland, Paul Drury, Joseph Webb, Eric Ravilious, John Minton, the glass engraving of Laurence Whistler, Franklin White and Clifford Harper. He also inspired a resurgence in twentieth-century landscape printmaking, which began amongst students at Goldsmiths' College in the 1920s. (See: Jolyon Drury, 2006)

=== Controversy in the 1970s ===
Palmer received a great deal of media attention in the 1970s, following the discovery of a number of fakes of his Shoreham work produced by famous art forger, Tom Keating. In February 1970, Geraldine Norman, Sale Room Correspondent for The Times, published a glowing report on a rare Shoreham Palmer painting, which 'probably dates from 1831', Shepherds with their Flock under a Full Moon, that was purchased by a major Bond Street gallery for £9400. At the top of the page was a four-column-width photo of the picture. A month later, David Gould, an authority on Victorian paintings with a special interest in Palmer, wrote a Letter to the Editor calling it a fake.

In June 1973, Norman reported that a Palmer landscape, The Horse Chestnut Tree, sold at Sotheby’s for £15,000. Shortly thereafter, Gould privately alleged to Norman that it too, was dubious. In 1974 Gould told Norman he had identified six more Palmer fakes, and he believed all were done by the same hand.

In 1976, Norman began researching over a dozen suspect Palmers, and after consulting with recognized Palmer experts from the Ashmolean, Fitzwilliam, Tate, and British Museums, as well as author Geoffrey Grigson, she published an article on 16 July 1976, on page one of The Times, asserting that thirteen Palmer pictures that had appeared on the market over the previous decade were forgeries. Several tips from readers convinced her the master faker she was looking for was Tom Keating, a picture restorer in Dedham, Essex, whom she named in another page one article the following month. A few days later, Keating wrote a Letter to The Times, confessing to ‘flooding the market’ with fakes –– not for material gain, but rather as a protest against greedy art merchants –– adding that he couldn’t imagine how anyone could believe his ‘crude daubs’ were authentic. The lead story in the Daily Express the same day read, ‘I FAKED THE LOT!’

The following week, Mr. Hugh Leggatt, a well-respected art dealer in Westminster, offered to host an exhibition of Keating’s ‘Palmers’ at his gallery in St James's Street. The Cecil Higgins Museum in Bedford had a Palmer called A Barn at Shoreham, purchased in 1965, on advice by Edward Croft Murray, the Keeper of Pictures at the British Museum, that it was authentic. They took it down in August 1976 when it was discovered to be a Keating fake. They rehung it four months later. Museum trustees commented ‘that there seemed to be more public interest in the drawing now it was known to be a fake than there had been in the genuine article.’ A Barn at Shoreham remains on view in the museum's art store.

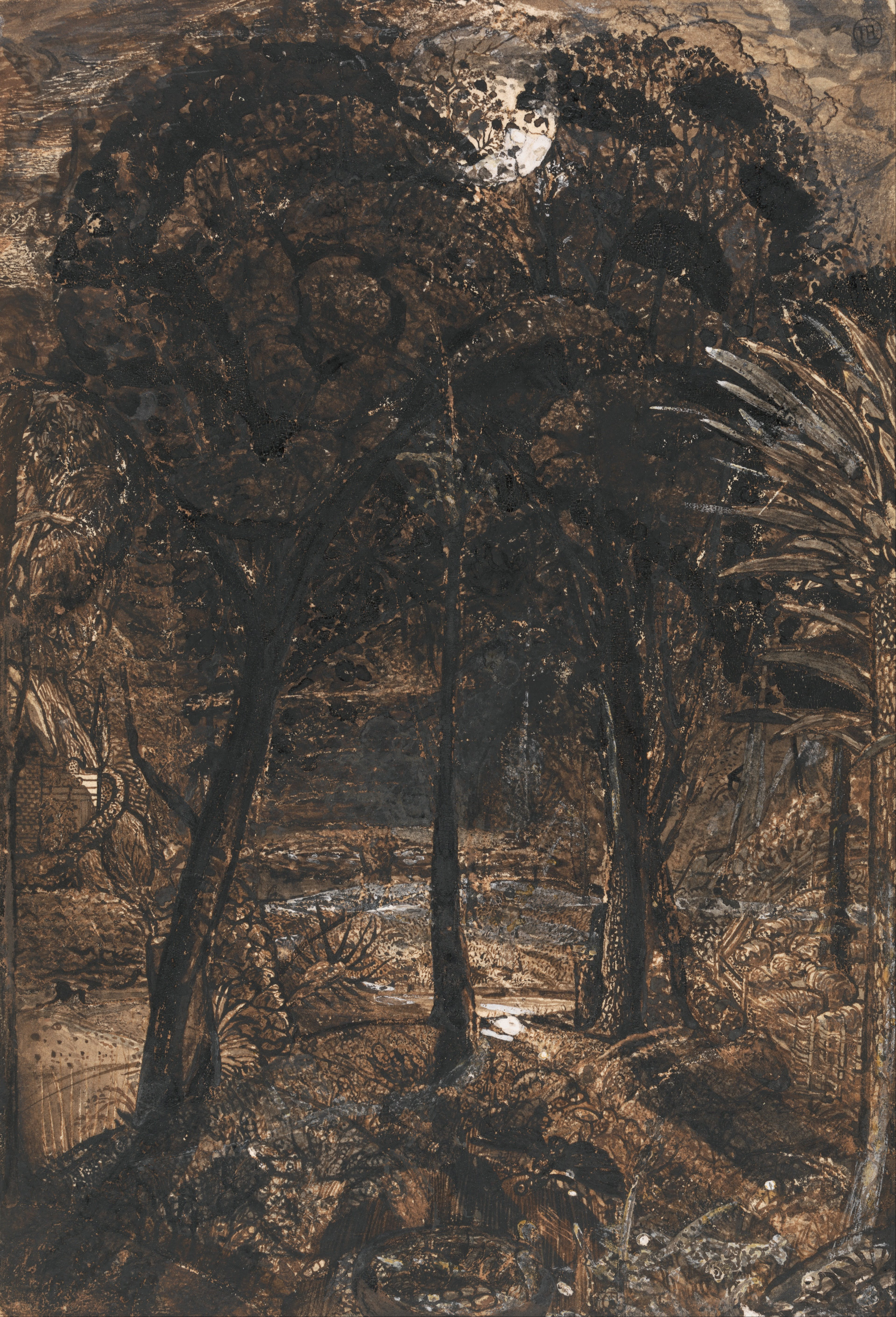
A Moonlit Scene with a Winding River (c.1827)

Norman went on to publish a total of eleven articles on the scandal, from July 1976 to February 1977, for which she won the British Press Awards News Reporter of the Year. In June 1977 she published an essay on Art Trading and Art Faking, in Keating’s autobiography, as well as a companion book The Tom Keating Catalogue, with descriptions and photo illustrations of 166 of his known pastiches, including 26 Palmers, which she hoped would provide scholars, collectors, and art dealers with sufficient information to detect his work, and help locate and identify as many of them as possible.

Keating later claimed to have painted upwards of eighty fake Palmers, most of them moonlit scenes in dark sepia wash, heightened with white. Four of them sold for thousands of pounds each, including The Horse Chestnut Tree, which Sotheby’s auctioned in June 1973 for £15,000 — ‘a record price for the artist’. These same four pictures were illustrated in James Sellars’ 1974 monograph, Samuel Palmer, and their sales resulted in Keating being arrested and put on trial for art fraud at the Old Bailey in 1979. He was later released due to failing health, and all charges were dropped. In the May 1977 BBC1 documentary, A Picture of Tom Keating, the master forger, commenting on Palmer’s captivating self portrait (see at top of this page), called him ‘a child genius, who’s eyes stare at me with a majesty and beauty... I look back on them now and say I’m not ashamed of what I’ve done, because his name is now more famous than ever.’

Times journalist David Carritt replied: ‘How insulting Palmer would have found the new stock...his magic vision diluted by a crop of heartless impostures, conceived in spite and peddled for gain’.

=== 21st century retrospectives ===
On the bicentenary of the artist’s birth, a major retrospective showcasing a hundred and seventy of his watercolours, drawings, etchings and oils from public and private collections around the world, was organized by the British Museum and the Metropolitan Museum of Art. Exhibited first in London from October 2005 to January 2006, then in New York from March to May 2006, Samuel Palmer: Vision and Landscape, emphasized his early work, but included more naturalistic watercolours, such as Scene from Lee, and A Cascade in Shadow, from his travels in Devon and Wales (1834-1836), as well as Cypresses at the Villa d'Este, and A View of Ancient Rome, from an ill-fated, two-year sojourn to Italy, with his new bride Hannah and his friend, George Richmond, and his wife (1837–38). The show concluded with works done after his return to England in 1840, such as the watercolour, Christian Descending into the Valley of Humiliation and the etchings, The Weary Ploughman, The Bellman, and The Lonely Tower.

In 2012, the Fine Art Society staged Samuel Palmer, His Friends and Followers, a London exhibition of Palmer’s influential visionary landscapes, along with works by Edward Calvert, George Richmond, Frederick Griggs, Paul Drury, Graham Sutherland, and Robin Tanner.

=== Commemorations ===
There are three commemorative plaques to Palmer. An unofficial blue plaque is located at Palmer's birthplace at Surrey Square. The Grade II listed Waterhouse, in Shoreham, Kent, has a plaque on it commemorating Palmer's residence there from 1827 to 1835. A Greater London Council blue plaque is located at 6 Douro Place, Kensington W8, marking that Palmer lived there from 1851 to 1861. His last home was The Chantry (the former Furze Hill Place), at Cronks Hill, near Redhill, which is Grade II listed for the Palmer connection.

The oldest house in Shoreham, Kent, is called Reed Beds, but is also known as the Samuel Palmer School of Fine Art. The National Portrait Gallery holds an 1829 portrait of Palmer by his friend George Richmond; the NPG's catalogue notes state that Palmer's expression and long hair recall Albrecht Dürer's 1500 self-portrait as Christ.

Palmer Close, a cul-de-sac in Redhill (built in the 1960s) was named in his honour.

== Writings ==
- An address to the Electors of West Kent: Pamphlet, 1832
- The 1861 Lives Balance Sheet: Epitaph on death of his son Thomas More Palmer
- On going to Shoreham, Kent to design from Ruth: A prayer, 1826
- With pipe and rural chaunt along: A poem, Samuel Palmer's Sketchbook 1824, British Museum Facsimile Published by William Blake Trust in 1862
