= George Richmond (painter) =

English painter

George Richmond RA
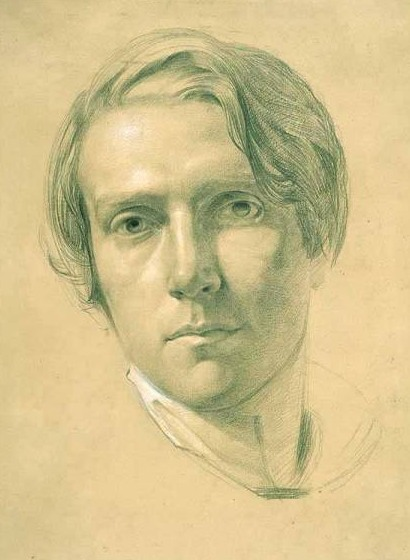
- Self-portrait, c. 1830
- Born: 28 March 1809; Brompton, London, England
- Died: 19 March 1896 (aged 86)
- Education: Royal Academy Schools
- Style: Portrait painting
- Spouse: Julia Tatham (m. 1831; died 1881)
- Children: 10, including William Blake Richmond
- Father: Thomas Richmond

George Richmond RA (28 March 1809 – 19 March 1896) was an English painter and portraitist. In his youth he was a member of The Ancients, a group of followers of William Blake. Later in life he established a career as a portrait painter, which included painting the portraits of the British gentry, nobility and royalty.

He was the son of Thomas Richmond, miniature-painter, and was the father of the painter William Blake Richmond as well as the grandfather of the naval historian, Admiral Sir Herbert Richmond.

A keen follower of cricket, Richmond was noted in one obituary as having been "an habitué of Lord's since 1816".

== Life ==
=== Early life ===
George was born at Brompton, then a country village, on 28 March 1809. His mother, Ann Richmond, came of an Essex family named Oram, and was a woman of great beauty and force of character. His brother Thomas Richmond was also a portrait artist.

One of his earliest recollections was the sight of the Life Guards marching to the cavalry barracks at Brompton on their return from the Waterloo campaign, and he remembered when a lad walking for a mile beside the Duke of York, in order to sketch him for his father, from whom he received his first instruction in art. He went for a short time only to a day school kept by an old dame in Soho, and at fifteen became a student at the Royal Academy. Here he was much impressed by the personality of Henry Fuseli, then professor of painting, formed a friendship, which lasted a lifetime, with Samuel Palmer, and had as fellow-students and companions Edward Calvert, Thomas Sidney Cooper, and Frederick Tatham, whose sister he married. Among other early friends was John Giles, Palmer's cousin, and a man of devout life and deep religion, who deeply influenced the literary taste, general culture, and religious views of his friends.

=== Blake and the Ancients ===
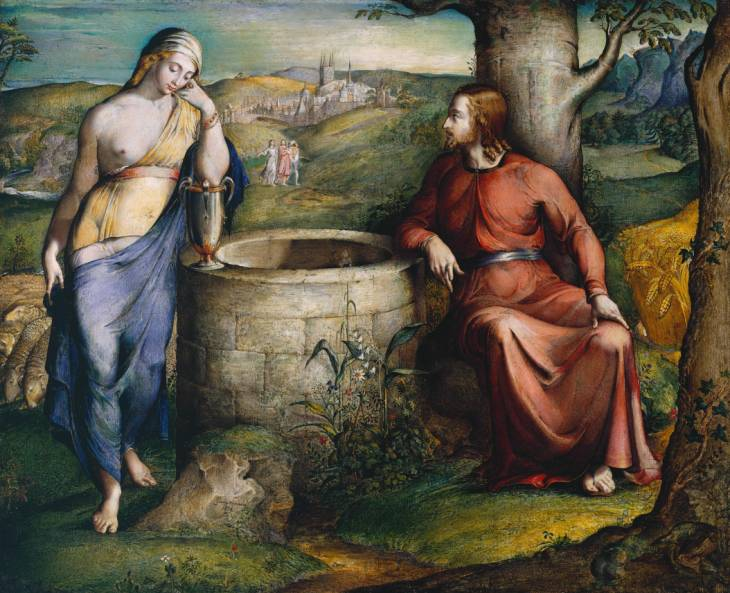
Christ and the Woman of Samaria (1825), one of Richmond's early works, influenced by the art of William Blake

When Richmond was sixteen he met William Blake, of whom Palmer and Calvert were devoted admirers, at the house of John Linnell at Highgate. The same night Richmond walked home across the fields to Fountain Court with the poet and painter, who left on Richmond's mind a profound impression, 'as though he had been walking with the prophet Isaiah.' From this time till Blake's death, Richmond followed his guidance and inspiration in art. Traces of Blake's influence are seen in all Richmond's early works, and especially in 'Abel the Shepherd,’ and in 'Christ and the Woman of Samaria,’ exhibited at the Royal Academy in 1825. In 1827 he was present at Blake's death, and had the sad privilege of closing the poet's eyes and taking his death mask; he, his wife Julia, and a little band of young enthusiasts, of whom he was the last survivor, followed Blake to his grave in Bunhill Fields.

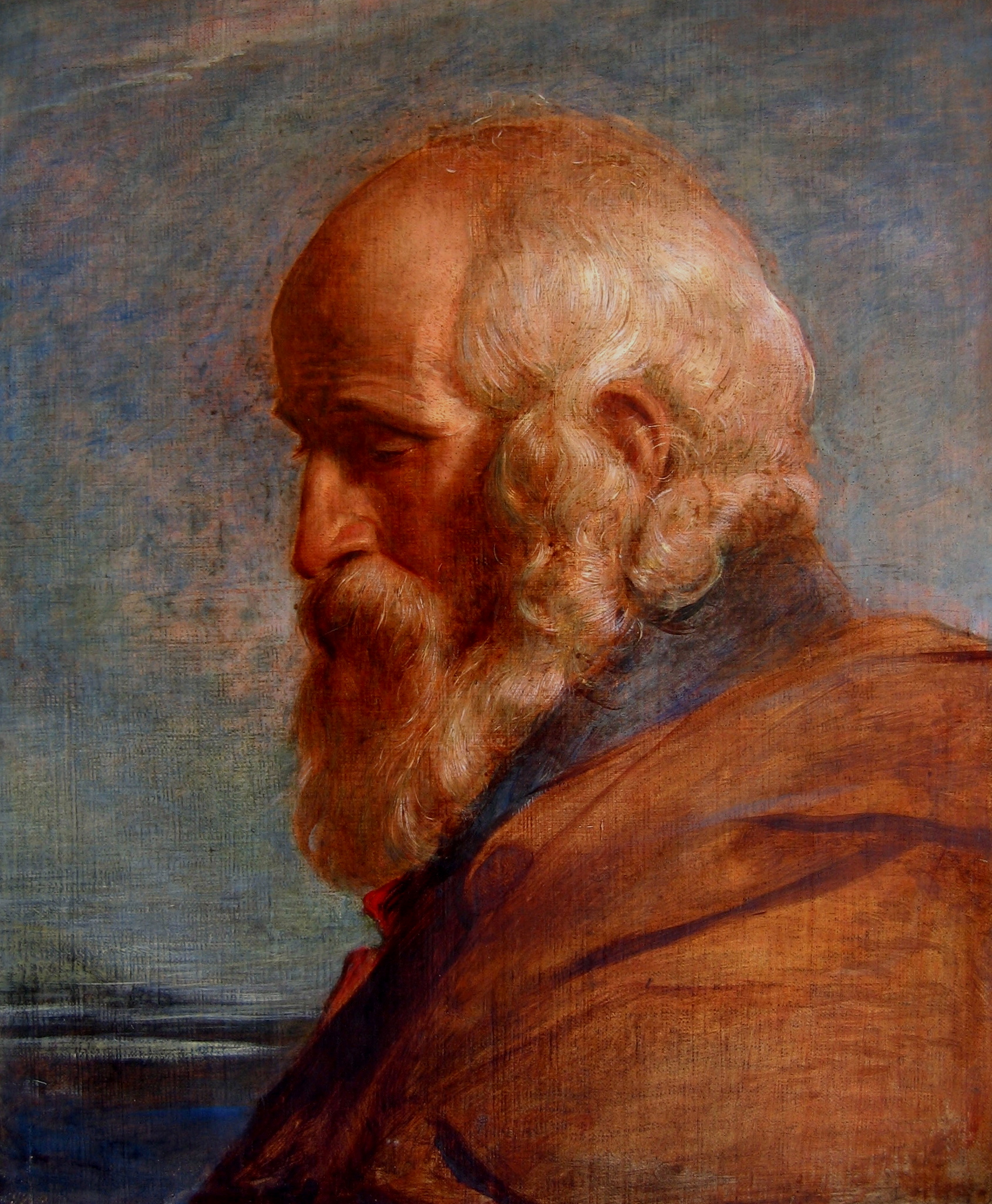
An Old Calabrian Shepherd, oil on canvas, 1838, 24 x 20 ins (Private Collection, UK)

Along with Palmer, Calvert, Tatham and others he formed the Blake-influenced group known as "The Ancients". This influence faded in later life, when he produced relatively conventional portraits.

=== Later life ===
In 1828 Richmond went to Paris to study art and anatomy, the expenses of the journey being met from money earned by painting miniatures in England before leaving and in France during his stay. He spent a winter in the schools and hospitals, and saw something of the social life of the Paris of Charles X; at Calais he exchanged pinches of snuff with the exiled Beau Brummell.

On his return to England he spent some time at the White Lodge, Richmond Park, with Lord Sidmouth, who gave him much valuable counsel, and whose portrait by him in watercolour is now in the National Portrait Gallery. In 1830 his contributions to the academy comprised two poetical subjects, 'The Eve of Separation' and 'The Witch,’ from Ben Jonson's 'Sad Shepherdess,’ and three portraits. In 1831 he exhibited but one picture, 'The Pilgrim.'

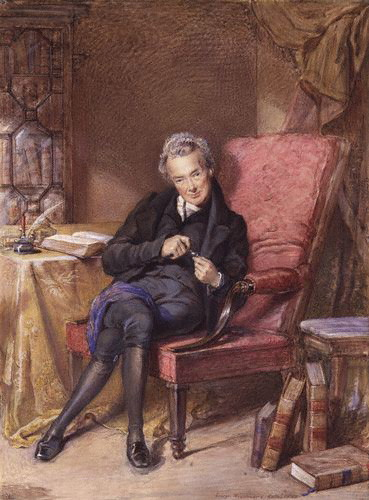
Watercolour of William Wilberforce, 1833

He had now formed a deep attachment to Julia, a beautiful daughter of Charles Heathcote Tatham, the architect, and when her father revoked the consent he had at first given to their union, the young couple ran away, journeyed to Scotland by coach in the deep snow of a severe winter, and were married according to Scottish law at Gretna Green in January 1831. This act proved the turning-point of Richmond's career, and determined him to adopt portraiture as the readiest means of earning a living. Soon after the young couple had set up house in Northumberland Street, they were found and befriended by Sir Robert Harry Inglis, and it was at his instance that the portrait in watercolour of William Wilberforce, afterwards engraved by Samuel Cousins, was painted by Richmond; this picture, by its happy treatment of a difficult subject, and by the excellence of the engraving after it, achieved a worldwide success. There followed immediately many successful watercolour portraits, among which may be mentioned those of Lord Teignmouth, the Frys, the Gurneys, the Buxtons, the Upchers, and the Thorntons, all traceable to Inglis's friendly introduction.

In 1837 Richmond was forced to take a rest for the sake of his health, which had broken down through overwork and the loss of three children within a very short time. He went to Rome with his wife and their surviving child Thomas, accompanied by Samuel Palmer and his bride, a daughter of John Linnell. During his stay in Italy, which lasted about two years, he made studies and copies of many of the subjects on the ceiling of the Sistine Chapel, having a scaffolding erected so as to reach the vault; here he made the acquaintance of Cardinal Mezzofanti, of whose colloquial English he always spoke with wonder. Subsequently, he visited Naples, Pompeii, and the cities of Tuscany with Baring, for whom he painted a picture of 'The Journey to Emmaus.' While still in Rome he painted a picture of 'Comus', afterwards exhibited. In southern Italy, Richmond painted three portraits in oil on canvas that would help establish his reputation as the pre-eminent portrait painter of his generation: 'An Old Calabrian Shepherd' (Feb. 1838), 'A Neapolitan' (Mar. 1837) and 'Vine Dresser' (Apr. 1838).

In Rome Richmond made many valuable friends, including Mr. and Mrs. Gladstone, Henry Acland, the Severns, Thomas Baring, Lord Farrer, and John Sterling, and his house on the Tarpeian rock was a meeting-place for these young English travellers. John Sterling, in letters to Richard Chenevix Trench, writes of Richmond as the most interesting young artist he had met. In after years he was one of the original members of the Sterling Club. He returned to England in 1839, and resumed his practice as a portrait-painter, revisiting Rome, however, with his brother Thomas in 1840. Then, as related in 'Præterita,’ Richmond made the friendship of Ruskin, who later introduced him to Thomas Carlyle. About the same period Richmond travelled in Germany with John Hullah, alighting on Munich where he studied for a while under Peter von Cornelius.

Richmond was a member of 'The Club' (Johnson's), Nobody's Friends, Grillion's Club, to which he was limner, and the Athenaeum Club, London. A staunch churchman, he was intimate for years with all the leaders of the tractarian movement. He received honorary degrees from the universities of Oxford and Cambridge, was a fellow of the Society of Antiquaries, an honorary fellow of University College, London, and of the Royal Institute of British Architects, and a member of the Company of Painter-Stainers of the City of London.

In 1846 he was nominated by Gladstone to succeed Sir Augustus Wall Callcott on the council of the government schools of design, a post which he held for three years; and ten years later he was appointed a member of the royal commission to determine the site of the National Gallery, when he was alone in voting for its removal from Trafalgar Square to South Kensington. In 1871, and again in 1874, Gladstone pressed upon him to accept the directorship of the National Gallery, but the prime minister was unsuccessful.

In 1870 he bought Porch House, a 15th-century timber-framed house in the Wiltshire village of Potterne, near Devizes, and took advice from Ewan Christian on its restoration. The work included the addition of glass mosaic floors and encaustic floor tiles.

George Richmond died at his house, 20 York Street, Portman Square, where he had lived and worked for fifty-four years, on 19 March 1896, retaining almost to the end a clear and vigorous memory. He is buried in a family grave on the eastern side of Highgate Cemetery (plot no.23902) and is commemorated by a tablet designed by his sons to be placed in the crypt of St. Paul's Cathedral, close to the graves of Sir Christopher Wren and of Lord Leighton. He left ten children and forty grandchildren.

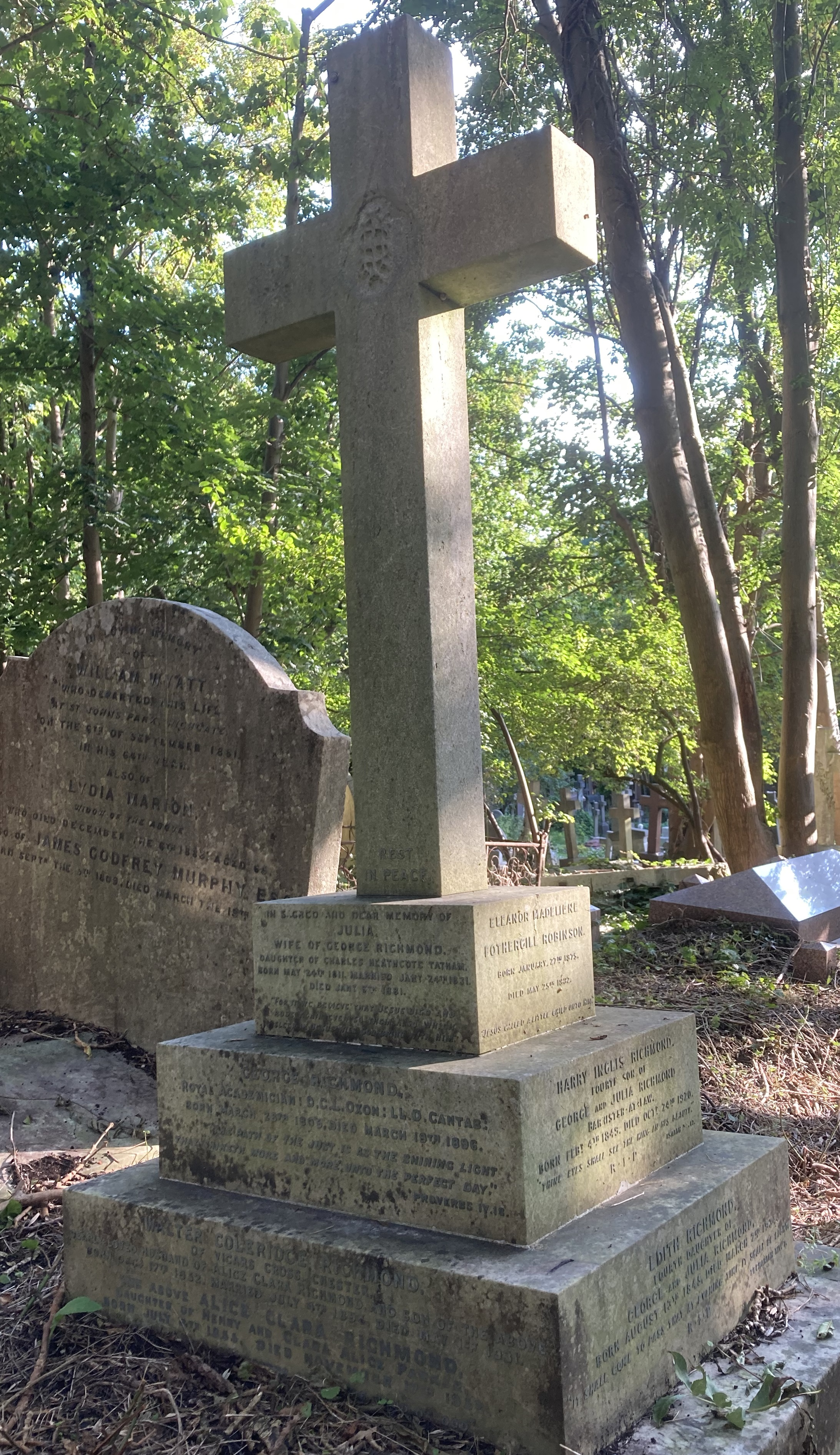
Family grave of George Richmond in Highgate Cemetery

His surviving sons included Canon Richmond of Carlisle and Sir William Blake Richmond, K.C.B., R.A. Of his daughters, three married respectively F. W. Farrer, Archdeacon Buchanan, canon of Salisbury, and Justice Kennedy.

== Works ==
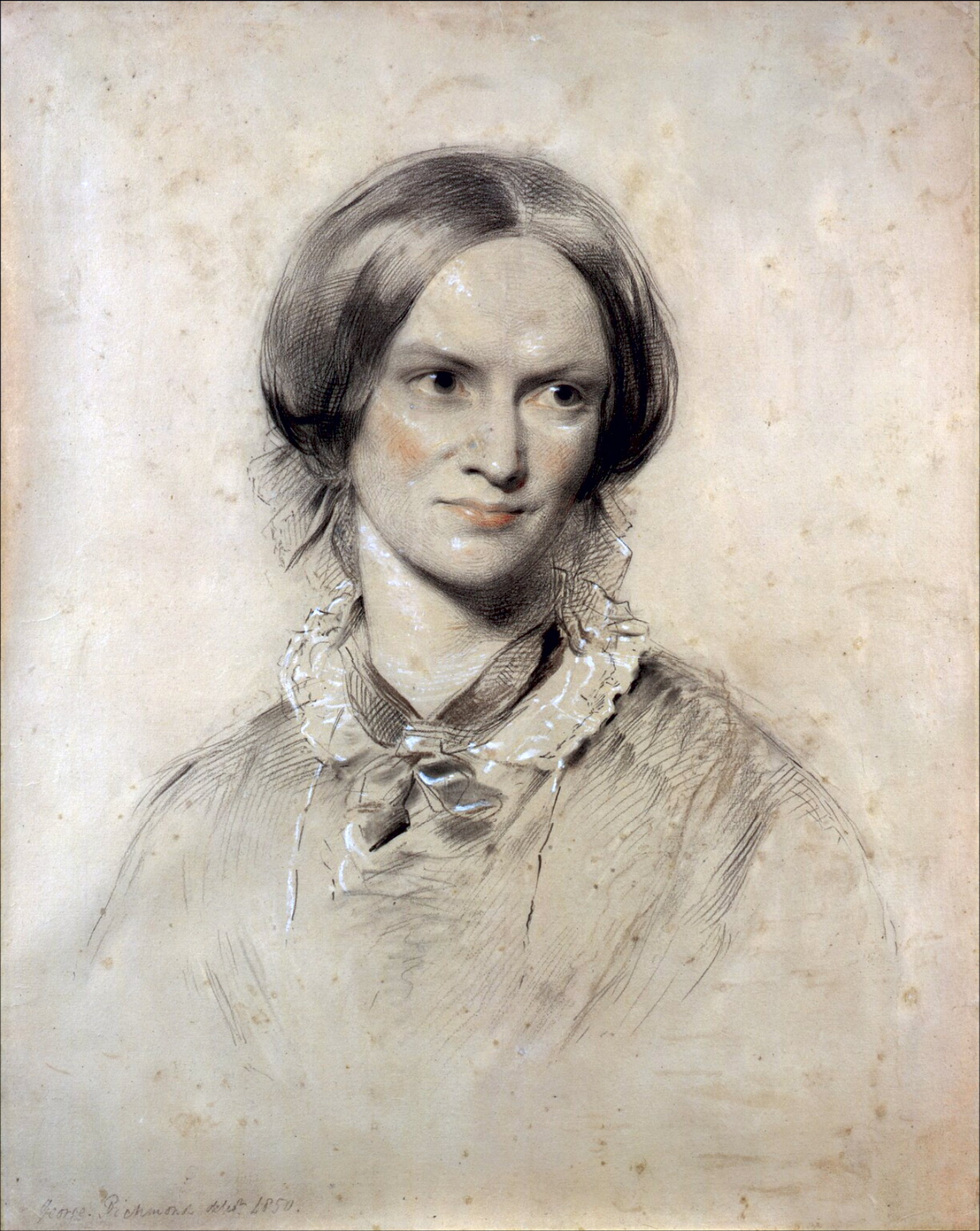
Charlotte Brontë by George Richmond, 1850

Richmond's portraits of eminent persons in England were steadily produced for forty years, initially in crayon and watercolour. After 1846 he began to paint in oil, and left a large number of excellent portraits in this medium. Many of his portraits were reproduced as engravings. The Victorian Exhibition held at the New Gallery in the winter of 1891–2 contained eight of his portraits in oil, forty in crayon, and two (Mrs. Fry and Sir Thomas Fowell Buxton, both dated 1845) in watercolour.

The oil pictures included Earl Granville, Archbishop Longley (1863), Bishops Selwyn and Wilberforce, Canon Liddon, and Sir George Gilbert Scott, R.A. (1877). Among the crayon portraits were Cardinal Newman (1844), John Keble, Henry Hallam (1843), Charlotte Brontë (1850), Elizabeth Gaskell (1851), Lord Macaulay (1844 and 1850), Sir Charles Lyell (1853), Michael Faraday (1852), and Lord Lyndhurst (1847).

He also drew or painted Queen Adelaide, Prince George (at that time Duke) of Cambridge, and the Prince of Wales, (later Edward VII) when a boy; Lord Palmerston, Lord Aberdeen, the Duke of Newcastle, and Gladstone; Cardinal Manning, Archbishop Tait, and Dean Stanley; Sir Thomas Watson, Syme, Alison, and Sir James Paget; Prescott, Harriet Beecher Stowe, Darwin, Owen, Harriet Martineau and Tyndall, and a host of others. Richmond was elected an associate of the Royal Academy in 1857, a royal academician in 1866, and some years before his death he joined the ranks of the retired academicians. He took a warm interest in the winter exhibitions of the old masters at the Royal Academy.

On the death of his wife in 1881 he gave up regular work, but still painted occasionally and occupied himself with sculpture. He had previously, in 1862, designed and executed a recumbent statue in marble of Charles James Blomfield, bishop of London, for St. Paul's Cathedral, and in 1882 he executed the marble bust of Dr. Pusey, now in Pusey House, Oxford, and presented a bust of John Keble to Keble College. Among his later works in oil were portraits of Harvey Goodwin, bishop of Carlisle, Edward King, bishop of Lincoln, and Archibald Campbell Tait, archbishop of Canterbury. In 1887, on the occasion of Queen Victoria's jubilee, he painted a portrait of the third Marquis of Salisbury (the last work he executed), which was presented to the queen by the marquis's wife.

His success as a portrait painter was due to his ability to sympathize with his sitter in conversation and to his skill in delineation. Being a skillful and rapid draughtsman, he was able—while putting himself into sympathy with his sitter—to report the happiest moment and fleeting changes of expression, and to get more out of his subject than there first appeared to be. His ideal of portraiture was 'the truth lovingly told;’ and he never consciously flattered. He was also a prolific sketcher of nature, and he produced hundreds of pencil and watercolour drawings of landscapes for his own pleasure.

In the National Portrait Gallery are portraits by him of Lord Sidmouth (watercolour); Lord-chancellors Cranworth and Hatherley, Baron Cleasby and Lord Cardwell (oil paintings); Samuel Rogers, the poet, and John Keble (crayon drawings), both bequeathed by the painter; besides drawings, purchased in July 1896, of Earl Canning, Viscount Hill, Sir George Cornewall Lewis, Canon Liddon, Archbishop Longley, Sir Charles Lyell, Cardinal Newman, Dr. Pusey, Sir Gilbert Scott, Sir Robert Harry Inglis, and Bishop Wilberforce.

== See also ==
- Portrait of Thomas Macaulay in article about the same
- Portrait of Charlotte Brontë in article about the same
- John Carter (1815–1850), paralysed mouth artist, befriended by Richmond
