= Eddie Linden =

Scottish poet and editor (1935–2023)

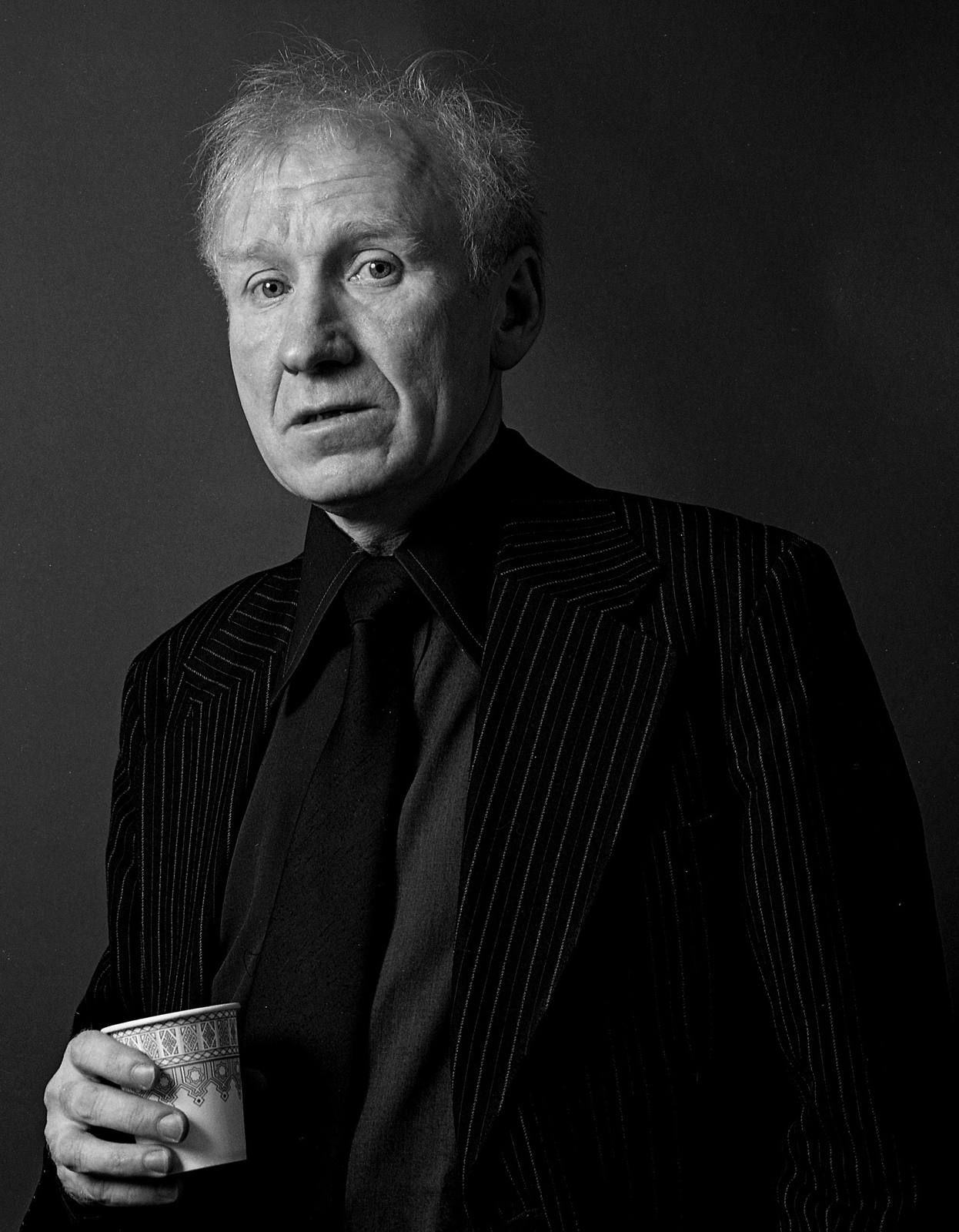
- Linden in 1985
- Born: John Edward Glackin; 5 May 1935; Motherwell, Lanarkshire, Scotland
- Died: 19 November 2023 (aged 88); Maida Vale, London, England
- Other names: Eddie S. Linden; Eddie Sean Linden; Edward Sean Linden
- Occupations: Poet; political activist; magazine editor

Edward Sean Linden (born John Edward Glackin; 5 May 1935 – 19 November 2023) was a Scottish-Irish poet, literary magazine editor, and political activist. From 1969 to 2002, he published and edited the poetry magazine Aquarius, which The Irish Post said made him "one of the leading figures on the international poetry scene". The journal was significant in the growth of British, Irish, and international poets and has been described as Linden's "crowning gift to literature—the nurturing and developing of poetic talent".

== Early life ==
Linden was born John Edward Glackin in Motherwell, Lanarkshire, on 5 May 1935, the illegitimate child of Irish parents Elizabeth Glackin and Joseph Watters. Linden never knew his birth father. His name was changed to Edward Sean Linden upon being adopted by Mary Glenn and coal miner Eddie Linden, whom he came to regard as his true parents; his adoptive father was actually related to Elizabeth by marriage. Linden was raised Roman Catholic in Bellshill. Mary died in 1944 and Eddie married a Presbyterian woman who disliked the young Linden. She failed to have him put in an asylum, so instead had him sent to an orphanage run by the Sisters of Charity. He was educated at Holy Family school in Mossend and St Patrick's school in New Stevenston.

At the age of 14, Linden was "released" from the orphanage, and was often homeless. He was put to work in a coal mine, then worked in a steel mill after being fired from mining. He was also employed as a ticket collector and porter at Hamilton West railway station. He was rejected for conscription as he was deemed underweight and suffered from a duodenal ulcer. Linden's religious upbringing caused him to struggle with his homosexuality, and he even sought treatment from doctors, but abandoned this after falling out with the medical staff.

== Political activism ==
A woman roars from an upper window
'They're at it again, Maggie!
Five stitches in our Tommie's face, Lizzie!
Eddie's in the Royal wi'a sword in his stomach
And the razor's floating in the River Clyde.'

— from "City of Razors" (1969)

Linden's political and literary awakening came when he joined the Young Communist League as a teenager. "At that time, the Communist Party had education classes – not just Marxist classes, but in Dickens, in Shakespeare – that was another discovery for me. Then there was the Workers' Educational Association. This was my way of getting away from that place and that life," he later recalled. According to his biographer John Cooney, "Linden sought freedom to explore his capabilities, away from what he felt were the dual Calvinist and Jansenist suffocations of the west of Scotland." Linden is said to have "wavered" in his communism following Moscow's suppression of the Hungarian Uprising of 1956. In 2001, he said he was "a lifelong socialist".

In August 1958, by then in his early 20s, the young Edward, who would be known as Eddie, moved to London to work as a porter at St Pancras railway station. That year, he met the Catholic priest Anthony Ross, who helped Linden come to terms with his homosexuality and encouraged him to take part in peace protests: he became involved with the Campaign for Nuclear Disarmament and the Catholic Worker. This led to friendships with the journalist Douglas Hyde and Jesuit priest Thomas Roberts. Upon Ross's death, Linden wrote an obituary of him for The Guardian.

An April 1959 article by Hyde in The Catholic Herald outlined the origins of the Catholic Nuclear Disarmament Group, for whom Linden would become secretary. Linden later noted:

It was some time at the end of the 1950s when I first came across a little bookshop in Glasgow called the Freedom Bookshop. This was run by an eccentric Cockney, Guy Aldred, who was then editing a paper called Freedom. I saw a book entitled I Believe by Douglas Hyde. (Note: The book was in fact called I Believed.) Also that day in that shop I picked up the American Catholic Worker produced by a remarkable person named Dorothy Day. The paper identified itself with the cause of peace and reconciliation. The book told a story of a man who had dedicated his life to Communism. At the time I was disillusioned but was still loosely attached to the Communist Party and the Young Communist League. These two items were to lead me back to a reconversion to Christianity of much greater social awareness.

In 1959, Linden arranged a meeting in Highbury Place for the Catholic CND, which was attended by novelist Pamela Frankau (the founder of the British version of The Catholic Worker), Barbara Wall and John O'Connor, secretary of Pax Christi, the Catholic peace movement. According to Linden, "the whole idea was to publicise the immorality of the bomb": the group were affiliated to the national CND, and a letter was sent to General de Gaulle to protest the French test explosion. The first Catholic banner was seen on an Aldermaston March in 1959, with 200 people; 600 associate members were part of the organisation.

In 1963, he co-founded the Simon Community, a charity in aid of the homeless, with Anton Wallich-Clifford, a probation officer at Bow Street Magistrates' Court. By 1966, Linden had become less politically active, and gone to study at the Catholic Workers' College in Oxford.

Linden took part in an August 1968 protest against Pope Paul VI's ruling over birth control which made headlines in the British press. The previous month, the Vatican had issued an encyclical, Humanae vitae, with a papal condemnation of contraception. In reaction to the sacking of British priests who opposed this stance, there were "heated exchanges" which "started a scuffle" on the steps of Westminster Cathedral as the congregation left a mass service. In a "verbal battle", Linden protested at a banner in support of the pope, saying, "I am entitled to my view. The Pope's document is splitting the church in two." A man began arguing with Linden, and the pair had to be separated. The man had earlier "snatched and torn" a poster held by a youth group who were supporting Father Paul Weir, an assistant priest who had been suspended for objecting to the ruling. Following the protests, Linden said, "I feel strongly for Father Weir. Here is a man who has given his life to the priesthood but, because he disagrees with the encyclical, he is out of a job." Linden's involvement was reported in front-page newspaper stories published by The Guardian and The Daily Telegraph. At the time, he was working as a hotel porter.

=== Party membership ===
In his mid-teens, Linden joined the Independent Labour Party, which had disaffiliated from the Labour Party some years previously, despite having played a key role in the latter's early years. The ILP had lost all of its MPs by this point, and Linden describes it as having been "in its dying days". In 2019, he recalled, "The first political party I ever joined was the Independent Labour Party back in Glasgow". Speaking to The Tablet, he said "I was 14 or 15. The next year I went one better and joined the Young Communist League. That was a great thing when I was growing up in Scotland. All the miners and steel workers were Catholic, but they were also members of the Communist Party."

It was his involvement with the Communist Party that led to him moving to London, but after several years, he came to the realisation that he was not a communist. He would go on to join the Labour Party, and in 2020, he stated, "I've been a Labour man all my life". In spite of his early inclinations towards the radical left, Linden did not support the left-winger Jeremy Corbyn, who led the party from 2015 to 2020, and voted for the centre-left candidacy of Keir Starmer in the 2020 contest to succeed Corbyn. Linden declared himself "delighted" with Starmer's subsequent election as Labour leader.

== Literary career ==
=== Aquarius ===
Linden had begun to organise poetry readings at the Lamb & Flag pub in Covent Garden, and in 1969, he started the poetry magazine Aquarius, which featured emerging writers. He was helped by the poet John Heath-Stubbs, and a donation from his friend, playwright Harold Pinter; it has been said that Linden was the inspiration for the character of Spooner in Pinter's play No Man's Land. Fellow poets George Barker and Peter Porter also allowed their work to be published for free. The first issue featured contributions from Heath-Stubbs, Barker, Stevie Smith and Kathleen Raine.

The magazine was published every few years and ran to 26 issues in all. Amongst others, Aquarius published works by Seamus Heaney, Ted Hughes, Tom Scott and Kathleen Jamie. Writing in the Times Literary Supplement in 2019, James Campbell stated that "the actual editing" was undertaken by figures such as Barker, Heath-Stubbs and Douglas Dunn, another Scottish poet. Linden raised the funds to keep the magazine going through the years, having started it with £4 capital and a loan from a friend. He was also helped by leading poet John Betjeman, who sent £5 for "good old Aquarius" every Christmas (adjusted for inflation, this sum of money would have been of higher value whilst Betjeman was alive).

A poetry reading at the Houses of Parliament was organised by Linden in April 1976, chaired by Labour MP Jock Stallard, featuring Heath-Stubbs and Dannie Abse, whose brother Leo was then a Labour MP. Abse's work was published in several editions of Aquarius, including the Welsh issue. A number of editions were similarly themed, including Irish, Scottish, Australian and Canadian issues; others honoured Heath-Stubbs, Roy Fuller, Hugh MacDiarmid and The Poetry of the Forties. Linden was also a member of the General Council of The Poetry Society for many years, and in 1990, he was elected to its Executive Council.

In 1991, the existence of Aquarius was said to be under threat, prompting a question in the House of Commons from Scottish Labour MP Brian Wilson to the Minister for the Arts, Tim Renton. This led to an Arts Council grant of £2000, and the magazine continued, with the publication of Aquarius Women in 1992. This special edition devoted to contemporary women's writing was guest edited by Hilary Davies, featuring contributions by Michèle Roberts, Jackie Kay, U.A. Fanthorpe, Carol Ann Duffy, Elspeth Barker, Marilyn Hacker, Helen Dunmore, Maureen Duffy, Fay Weldon and Elizabeth Jennings.

Profiling Linden for The Guardian in 1993, John Ezard commented, "For several generations of writers he has been part of the cultural furniture". During the period in which Aquarius was published, Irish broadcaster Frank Delaney said that Linden was "a butler to literature", and journalist Auberon Waugh called it the best poetry magazine in Britain. In 1991, it was reported that the Conservative Home Secretary, Kenneth Baker, was a subscriber. Linden edited Aquarius from his flat – which was described by The Guardian as a "spartan bedsit in Maida Vale" – until 2002. Throughout his activities in literature and politics, Linden was often known as Eddie S. Linden, the middle initial standing for "Sean".

A Festschrift, Eddie's Own Aquarius, edited by Constance Short and Tony Carroll, was published in tribute to Linden himself in 2005. Marking Linden's 70th birthday, it featured tributes from friends and contributions from writers who had appeared in the magazine, amongst them poets Seamus Heaney, Alan Brownjohn, Roger McGough, Dannie Abse, Brian Patten, Elaine Feinstein, Alasdair Gray, Paul Muldoon, Tom Paulin, illustrator Ralph Steadman, politician Clare Short (a cousin of the book's co-editor Constance), artist Craigie Aitchison, academic Bernard Crick, former CND chair Bruce Kent, writer James Kelman and emeritus Poet Laureate Andrew Motion. Heaney, who knew him in London, dedicated "A Found Poem" to Linden.

=== Poet ===
Comfortable little suburb north of London
With its wooded heath
Where queers and heteros nest at night
Little girls in mini-skirts
Boys with long hair and pockets full of French letters
Preparing for a night's fucking

— from "Hampstead by Night"

As well as publishing poetry in Aquarius, Linden also wrote and gave readings of his own poems, such as "City of Razors", which recalls the sectarian violence of his youth in Glasgow. He had been writing verse since his teenage years, and after moving south, was encouraged by Barker and Porter. He had known Barker's son Sebastian at Oxford, and in 1965 met his mother, the writer Elizabeth Smart, who adopted him as a protégé; she was complimentary about the letters Linden wrote, and, following her death, he remarked, "She was a mother to me." He was also friends with the novelist (and subsequently Hollywood screenwriter) Alan Sharp, who based the character of Sammy Giffen on Linden in his book The Wind Shifts, published in 1967.

In 1980, City of Razors, a collection of Linden's poems, was published. It won praise from Pinter, Gavin Ewart and Lord Longford. Reviewing the collection, The Guardian said that Linden "can be seen to be a poet who shares with Paul Potts a quality of trusting helplessness before the world, a rare and moving state of awareness." In April 1981, continuing his commitment to the renewed anti-nuclear movement, Linden appeared at Poets against the Bomb, an event staged by Kensington and Chelsea CND at Chelsea Town Hall. In a line-up that included performances by Pete Brown, Ivor Cutler, Gavin Ewart, Adrian Henri and Harold Pinter, Linden read his poem "Hampstead by Night". Sponsored by the Greater London Arts Association and the Arts Council of Great Britain, it was filmed, and is thus a rare example of Linden's performance preserved for posterity. The film was premiered at the London Film Festival.

The Penguin Book of Homosexual Verse (1983) included another of Linden's gay-themed poems, "A Sunday in Cambridge". A second volume of his poetry, A Thorn in the Flesh, was published in 2011. Linden gave readings of his poems on BBC One, BBC Radio 3, BBC Radio Scotland, Radio Clyde, and LBC Radio. He also gave live readings at venues around the United Kingdom, Ireland, France, Canada, and the United States.

== Tributes and cultural depictions ==
Who is Eddie Linden, a biography written by Sebastian Barker, with illustrations by Ralph Steadman, was published in 1979, covering the story of Linden's life up until the launch of Aquarius. It later inspired a stage play of the same name, which was produced in 1995 at The Old Red Lion in Islington, north London. Written by William Tanner, the play starred Michael Deacon as Linden, receiving good notices and playing to packed houses. It co-starred Dallas Campbell as a young man trying to get his poetry published by Linden, and ran from 28 February to 25 March 1995.

In June 1975, Linden was the subject of a portrait by Harry Diamond, who captured Soho artists on camera, and in October 1985, Linden was photographed by Granville Davies. Both prints are now held by the National Portrait Gallery in London. In late 2005, the photographer Eamonn McCabe photographed Linden for The Guardian.

Linden's 80th birthday was celebrated with a party at Conway Hall in 2015, at which he recited several of his poems. Barker's widow, the poet Hilary Davies, described Linden as "loyal and non-judgmental", and, comparing him to a meerkat, said he was "sociable, communicative, ferreting in corners for choice morsels and then delighting in showing it to the community". He was presented with a portrait of himself by London Irish artist Luke Canavan.

In 2018, a different oil painting of Linden by Canavan was displayed at the Royal Society of Portrait Painters Annual Exhibition, which took place at the Mall Galleries in London.

Other poets have written about Linden in their work, or named him as in inspiration for poems. These include "The Ballad of Eddie Linden at Earl's Court" by Ken Smith (1986). Gavin Ewart's "Eddie Linden" was included in a 1991 anthology of Ewart's poems. In 2000, Matthew Sweeney's "Incident in Exeter Station", published as The Saturday Poem in The Guardian, was dedicated to Linden. The poem "Fugitive Colours" by Liz Lochhead (2016) references Linden.

Linden's personality was summarised by his friend Gerald Mangan in a pen and ink drawing of Linden arriving at the gates of Heaven accompanied by Saint Peter, who appeals to a surly God, "He says he's a manic-depressive alcoholic lapsed-Catholic Irish working-class pacifist-communist bastard from Glasgow. And would you like to subscribe to a poetry magazine?"

== Personal life and death ==
Linden, who was gay, never had a partner or married. In an interview with The Tablet in 2017, Linden said, "I've been described as a Catholic atheist, but that's not right. I am a Catholic who finds it difficult to believe in God. There was a day when I used to run about with rosary beads and stuff like that, but I don't do that now."

In 2020, he was diagnosed with Alzheimer's disease. On 19 November 2023, Linden died in a care home in Maida Vale, west London, aged 88, as a result of old age and Alzheimer's. His funeral took place on 8 December, with a cremation at the West London Crematorium in Kensal Green. In an obituary, The Irish Times wrote, "With his death, a whole era in postwar British poetry has come to a close."

A memorial service for Linden was held on 11 July 2024 at October Gallery in Bloomsbury.

== Works ==
- City of Razors and other poems, Jay Landesman, 1980
- A Thorn in the Flesh: Selected Poems, Hearing Eye, 2011
