= Harry Diamond (photographer) =

British photographer (1924–2009)

- Born: 25 August 1924; London, England
- Died: 3 December 2009 (aged 85); London, England
- Occupation: Photographer

Harry Diamond (25 August 1924 – 3 December 2009) was a photographer known for his photographs of artists, jazz musicians, and the East End of London. He was born and worked in London.

At the time of his death, Diamond was described in The Times as "one of the heroes of British 20th-century photography ...his acutely observed pictures showed a polish and hue not often seen in the canons of British photography."

== Subjects ==
Before becoming a photographer in the 1960s, Harry Diamond worked as a stagehand. He often drank in Soho and photographed many of the artists several times, including Frank Auerbach, Francis Bacon, and Lucian Freud, Stephen Finer, John Wonnacott and others, as well as the photographer John Deakin.

Other artists whom he photographed included Michael Andrews, William Coldstream, Peter Saunders, Edward Middleditch, Eduardo Paolozzi, Peter Blake, and the duo Gilbert and George. Diamond also took a portrait of the poet Eddie Linden in 1975.

From his interest in jazz, Diamond also photographed jazz musicians. An early exhibition was called "West End Blues" after Louis Armstrong's recording. Diamond photographed the Duke Ellington Orchestra, photographing Paul Jeffrey and Paul Gonsalves together and Ellington himself on stage. A photograph of Ellington was chosen by Bruce Bernard for the collection he made of 100 photographs from 1840 to 1990 that were exhibited at the V & A and published in the Phaidon Press book of the same name.

Diamond photographed people in London streets, and as buildings disappeared, photographed the East End of London where he lived.

== Collections and photographic archive ==
Diamond's photographs are in the collections of the National Portrait Gallery, the Arts Council Collection and photographs formerly owned by Sam Wagstaff were acquired in 1984 by J. Paul Getty Museum.

Harry Diamond's photographic archive is now in the collection of the National Portrait Gallery.

== Publications ==
Among other publications, Diamond's photographs have appeared in The Sunday Times Magazine, Die Zeit Magazine, Financial Times, The Guardian, The Daily Mail,Telegraph Magazine, Evening Standard, The Times, London Magazine, Into Jazz, Melody Maker, Art International, British Journal of Photography, Modern Painters, The New York Times, The Spectator, and The Tablet. His photographs have appeared in books and catalogues and on BBC Television.

Harry Diamond's photograph of Duke Ellington appears in 100 photographs chosen by Bruce Bernard, published by Phaidon to accompany the exhibition held at the Victoria and Albert Museum. The book One Hundred Photographs: A Collection by Bruce Bernard was published by Phaidon Press in 2002.

London Magazine reproduced eleven of Diamond's photographs in a single issue in 1973. His photographs were the subject of articles in Creative Camera by Tom Evans, New Society and an illustrated feature in The Sunday Times Magazine.

== Selected exhibitions ==
Diamond's photographs have been shown in the Hayward Gallery, Photographer's Gallery, Battersea Arts Centre, Louisiana Museum of Modern Art, Michael Parkin Fine Art, Cafe Gallery Southwark (now Southwark Park Galleries), National Portrait Gallery, Sudley House, The Space, Victoria and Albert Museum, Whitechapel Art Gallery and elsewhere.

== Portraits of Harry Diamond ==
Harry Diamond was painted four times by Lucian Freud, first in Interior at Paddington in 1951 and three times subsequently. A photograph by Herb Greer of Diamond with Frank Norman appears on the cover of Norman's book Stand on Me published in 1959.

== Death ==
Diamond died aged 85 in Whipps Cross Hospital on 3 December 2009.
