= Sexual Heretics =

1970 book by Brian Reade

Sexual Heretics: Male Homosexuality in English Literature from 1850 to 1900
- Author: Brian Reade
- Publisher: Routledge, Coward-McCann (USA)
- Publication date: 1970
- Publication place: United Kingdom
- ISBN: 978-0-71-006797-5

Sexual Heretics: Male Homosexuality in English Literature from 1850 to 1900 (1970) is an anthology by Brian Reade, published by Routledge.

== Outline ==
Sexual Heretics discusses a growing clandestine literature on the topic of male homosexuality (termed "Uranianism" at the time), in English literature and the growth of a homosexual subculture in England from the 1850s, ending shortly after the trials of Oscar Wilde in 1895. The book, which contains 89 selections of prose and poetry, has been described by E. M. Forster biographer Wendy Moffat as "the first serious attempt to recuperate a lost gay canon in print". It included works of prose, scholarly literature and ribald poetry.

Reade attributes the emergence of a homosexual subculture to the "sexually inhibitive" and controlling matriarchs within Victorian households, as well as the rise of middle-class families who sent their sons to colleges such as Winchester and Harrow "where homosexuality flourished because it was expedient", and the rise of neoclassicism which romanticised pederasty in ancient Greece.

Although a number of openly homosexual poets began to produce homosexual-themed works during this time period, Reade notes that even heterosexual poets such as Alfred, Lord Tennyson contained homosexual or homoerotic subtexts in their poems (for example Tennyson's "In Memoriam A.H.H."), including such texts ad they feature literary evidence of homosexual feelings and of "homosexuality as a romantic stimulus". Because of this, some critics have said that Reade still overestimates the extent of male homosexuality in English literature in this period.

Alex Comfort, the author of The Joy of Sex, wrote that by including works such as "In Memoriam" and Adonais, while excluding Rochester's Sodom or Lord Byron's Don Leon, Reade only focuses on homosexual literature that is written in a camp style.

== Works included ==
Notable works mentioned in the anthology include:

- Adonais by Percy Bysshe Shelley
- "In Memoriam A.H.H." by Alfred, Lord Tennyson
- A Problem in Modern Ethics by John Addington Symonds
- Leaves of Grass by Walt Whitman
- "The Portrait of Mr. W. H." and "Wasted Days" by Oscar Wilde
- Teleny, an anonymous pornographic novel which focuses near-exclusively on male homosexuality
- The "Terminal Essay" by Richard Francis Burton regarding the so-called "Sotadic zone", footnoted in his translation of The Arabian Nights
- Two poems from English occultist Aleister Crowley's poetic work White Stains
- A selection of William Shakespeare's sonnets

== See also ==
- Lieblingminne und Freundesliebe in der Weltliteratur
- The Penguin Book of Homosexual Verse
