= Tom Keating =

English art restorer and forger (1917–1984)

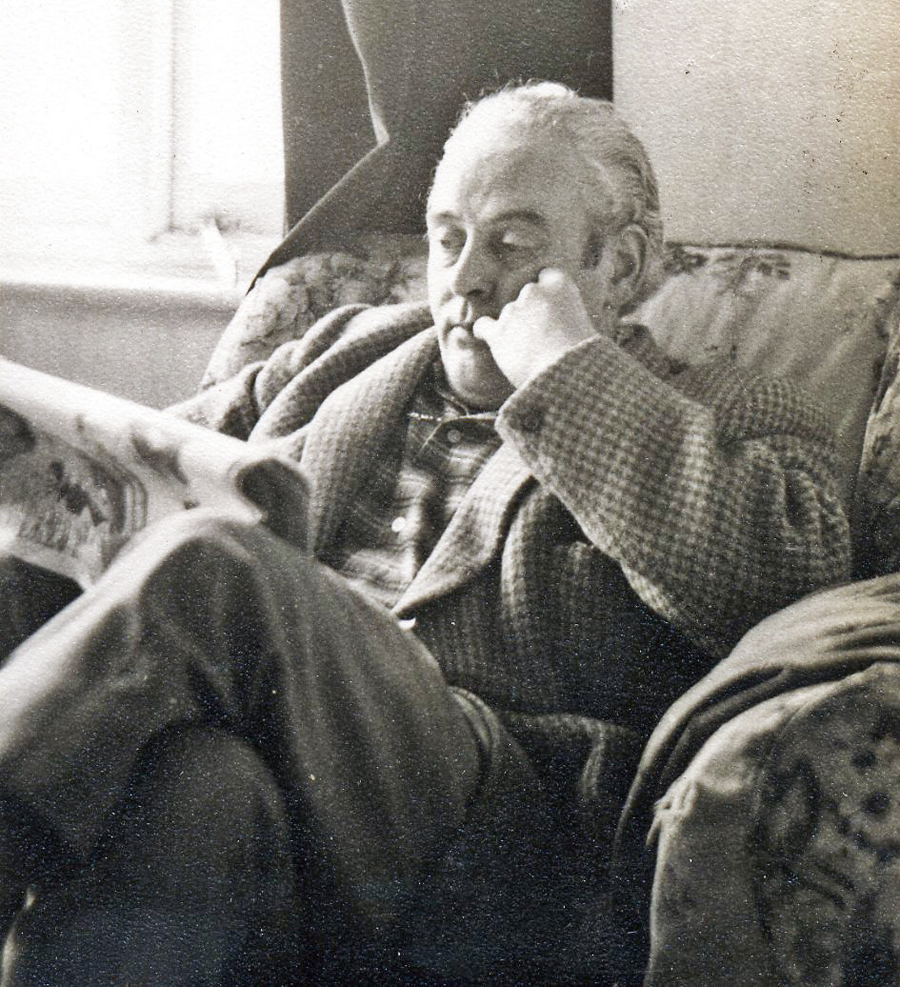
- Keating at Jane Kelly's family home in Kew, London, 1967.
- Born: 1 March 1917; Forest Hill, London, UK
- Died: 12 February 1984 (aged 66); Dedham, Essex. UK
- Education: Self-taught
- Known for: Old master forgeries, protest against the art trade
- Notable work: Major restoration of Marlborough House murals, two television series on how to paint like the Old Masters, The Hay Wain in Reverse

Thomas Patrick Keating (1 March 1917 – 12 February 1984) was an English artist, art restorer and art forger. Considered the most prolific and versatile art forger of the 20th century, he claimed to have faked more than 2000 paintings by more than 160 different artists of unprecedented scope—ranging from the Renaissance (Holbein, Titian, Tintoretto) to Modernism, Expressionism and Fauvism (Kandinsky, Klee, Matisse)—with heavy emphasis on English landscape Romanticists and the French Impressionists. Total estimated profits from his forgeries amount in today's value to more than $10 million.

He claimed his aim was not material gain, but rather a crusade against art dealers he believed were only interested in fine art as a commodity, for which an impressive provenance, often dubious or wholly invented, always trumped the masterful artistry and intrinsic beauty of any particular drawing or painting.

He began flooding the London art market in the early 1950s with hundreds of consistently convincing fakes, often by giving them to friends and acquaintances, with tacit expectation that many would soon end up in a posh Bond Street auction house, or gallery.

He escalated his crusade in the late 1960s and early 1970s by directing his business partner and lover, Jane Kelly, to sell several fakes of then little known romanticist, Samuel Palmer. As a result of these sales, both Keating and Kelly ended up on trial, in 1979, at the top criminal court in Britain, charged with art fraud. Kelly pleaded guilty and received an 18-month sentence, suspended for two years. After two days giving evidence, Keating ended up in hospital for a motorbike injury. He returned for a third day in court, during which he collapsed in the witness box, and was taken back to hospital. He was released without charge two weeks later due to failing health.

In 1982, he starred in an award-winning Channel 4 television series in which he instructed viewers in the intricately detailed painting techniques of his favourite Old Masters. A followup series, focusing on the Impressionists, began airing two days after his death, in 1984.

== Early life ==
Keating was born into a working-class family in an overcrowded flat in Forest Hill, South London. As a youth, living hand to mouth on his father's shilling-and-sixpence hourly wage as a house painter, he helped his mother make ends meet by collecting and selling horse manure, running errands for neighbours, and taking parcels to the local pawn shop. Growing up he worked as a delivery boy, lather boy, lift boy and bellboy before finally joining the family business as a house painter.

=== Art classes ===
He discovered his love and early talent for picture-making at Eltham College primary school in Kent. Having run away from home to visit his grandmother seven miles away, he ended up staying for three years, trading persistent poverty and grim prospects for regular home-cooked meals and a headmistress who was also an art teacher, who encouraged him to spend as much time as he liked drawing and painting owls, foxes, badgers, and a sailing ship. When his grandmother died, he returned to Forest Hill.

At the age of 14, he passed an entrance exam for the nearby, prestigious, St Dunstan's College, but was crestfallen when told the impossible sum required for clothes and books needed just to start. He returned to odd jobs and house painting, developing his own talent for detailing woodwork, graining, marbling, and sign writing.

=== Navy tour ===
Keating was called up to the Royal Navy in the spring of 1940, finishing his training in time to face combat at Dunkirk, before setting off for Singapore aboard the SS Strathmore. He spent the next three years in the South China Sea on a variety of vessels, also spending time in hospital for a range of illnesses, including shock, and injuries he attributed to the abuse of fellow crewmen and officers dubious of a sailor who spent all his free time on his own, reading and drawing, instead of carousing with the rest of them.

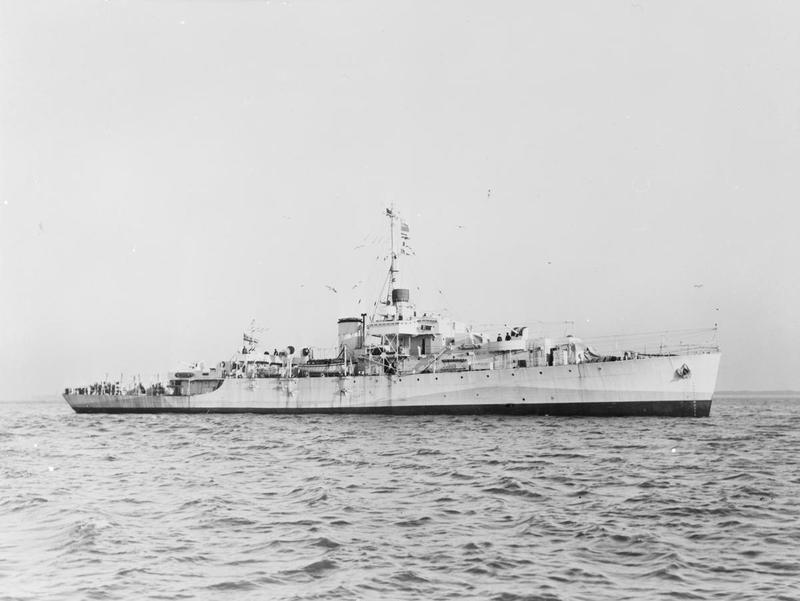
HMS Lagan, 1943.

On 15 September 1943, he was posted to the frigate HMS Lagan as a stoker first class, and sent into the Battle of the Atlantic, escorting a convoy of merchant supply ships from Liverpool to New York. After suffering major defeats four months earlier, the German U-boat offensive had been withdrawn from the North Atlantic, awaiting tactical and technical improvements, which were now complete. In the small hours of 20 September 1943, the Lagan became the first Allied warship to be hit by the new T5 acoustic torpedo, which tore off her entire stern, killing more than a quarter of the crew, and leaving the remainder dead in the water southwest of Iceland, about a third of the way into their journey. The Lagan was towed back to Merseyside. Nerves shattered and his back badly injured by Hedgehog shrapnel, Keating was sent home to hospital for psychiatric treatment – a fortnight in an induced coma, then discharged with a disability pension of 17 shillings a week. He soon married his wife Ellen, with whom he had two children, Douglas, and Linda. They separated in 1952.

=== Self-taught ===
Keating always claimed he learned his most important skills as an artist through independent study and experimentation on his own. His early sources of inspiration were chiefly Venetian School father of the Renaissance, Titian; Baroque Dutch master Rembrandt, pioneering British portrait and landscape painter Thomas Gainsborough, and the Romanticists Goya, Turner and Constable. He divined their secrets by spending countless hours scrutinising and sketching examples of their work in Britain's greatest museums, especially the National Gallery, The Royal Academy and the Tate.

In 1950, he was given for his service in the war a two-year course at Goldsmiths' College, and a grant from the Ministry of Labour of £4 and 5 shillings a week (£4.25 in decimal currency). He supplemented this by working nights and weekends, but was seldom able to simultaneously manage all the expenses of essential art supplies and feeding his family. He then discovered he lacked the prerequisite A-levels to qualify for a teaching certificate. He was disappointed with the calibre of technical training on offer, and had little interest in the modern art movements in vogue at the time (he was ridiculed for praising the work of Pietro Annigoni, who only a few years later was commissioned to paint a popular portrait of the Queen). He failed two final exams––praised for "painterly technique", thwarted by his composition's "insufficient originality".

Never immune to self-contradiction, Keating told a journalist in May 1977 he had to unlearn everything he was taught at Goldsmith's. In his autobiography published the following month, he credited some of the training he received there with getting him started on a career.

== Art restorer ==
While studying at Goldsmith’s, Keating secured a part-time job as a restorer, at the well-respected Hahn Brothers, in Mayfair, where he began meticulously filling thousands of tiny cracks in old pictures. The breadth of his expertise in painting techniques quickly expanded, however, when he began taking more challenging jobs on the shady fringes of the London art market, where he learned to skilfully mimic the methods (known as Pastiche) of scores of lesser-known artists, in the course of figuring out how to fix them. A typical instruction he got in such establishments was, ‘here, show us what you can do with this’.

While working in a small shop for a man called Fred Roberts, he was asked to replace a herd of grazing cattle––that had been obliterated by the repair of a large tear in a 19th-century painting by Thomas Sidney Cooper––with laughing children dancing around a maypole, dramatically enhancing the picture's charm. So impressed was he with several of Keating's "repairs", Roberts framed them, added a forged signature, and put them up in a nearby showroom for hundreds, even thousands of pounds, all while paying Keating slave wages, generally £5 to £10 per week.

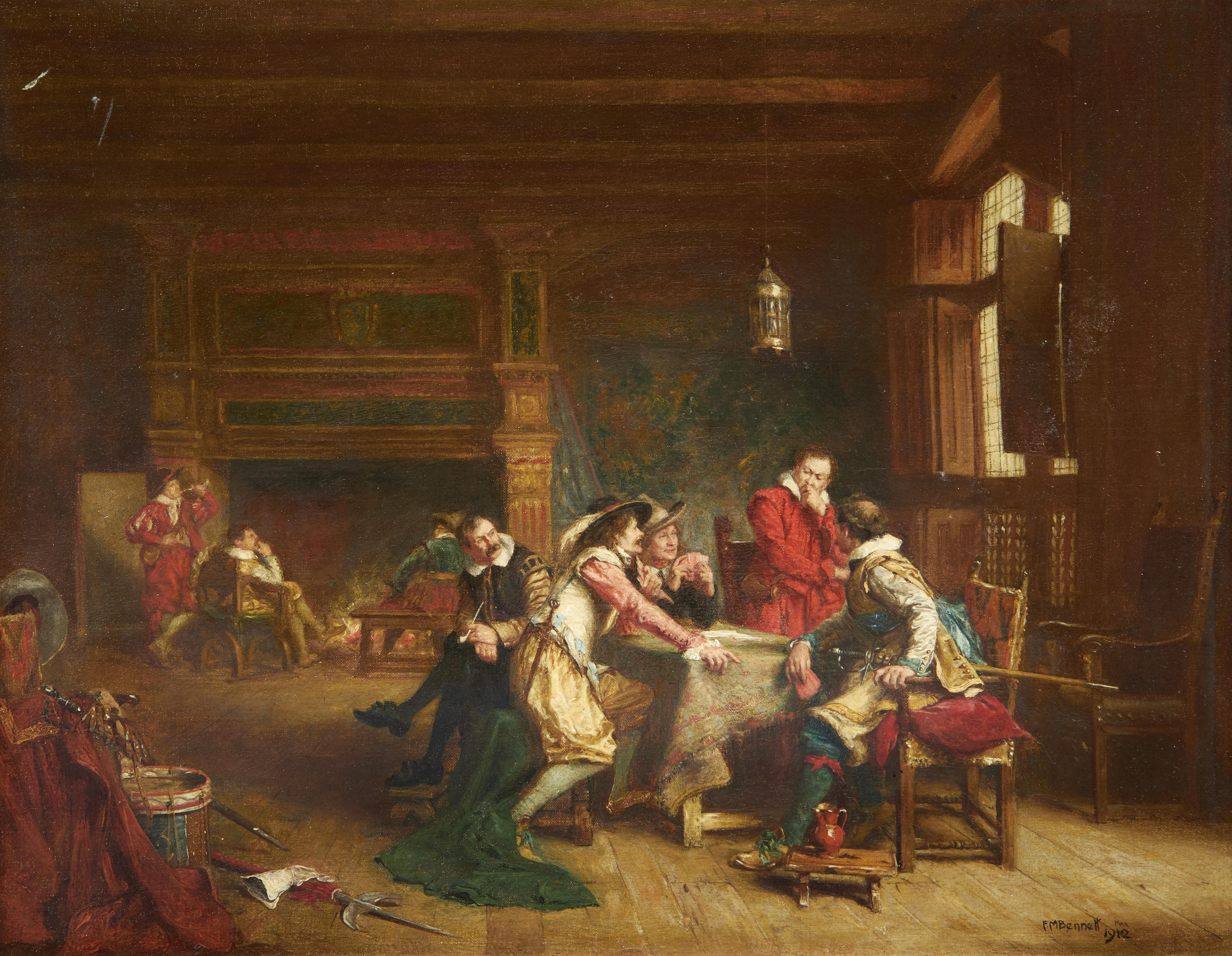
Frank Moss Bennett: Cavaliers playing cards, 1912

When Keating discovered some Frank Moss Bennetts he had nearly completely repainted for Roberts on offer at a posh West End gallery for £1,500 to £3,000, he was so disgusted he dashed back, gave Roberts an earful of expletives and quit on the spot, hurling a palette at him as a parting gesture.

When he later found evidence of similar subterfuge rampant throughout the trade—dealers raking in cash while his wife and children were stuck in a damp, dilapidated flat, with scant, tattered furniture and often little to eat—he decided he too could play at that game. A forger was born, with a sense of righteous indignation and a desire for vengeance that plagued him the rest of his life; baffling those who thought his tremendous talent could be put to far better use; landing him in the Old Bailey on charges for fraud; bringing him post-trial wealth and fame; and condemning him––through the stress on his health of violent mood swings and massive consumption of tobacco and alcohol––to an early death.

== Crusade against the art world ==
Keating never got rich off the fakes he produced, rather he often gave them away as gifts, bartered them for food, booze, and rent, or sold them for a pittance to friends and acquaintances, even the local gas man.

Keating's main objective was a vendetta against corrupt, predatory art dealers whom he believed victimised both artists and the buying public. Not long after finding a number of old pictures that he had been ordered to "enhance" were on sale nearby for inflated prices, he was taken in by an even more perfidious employer. Keating would often stay after hours painting pictures in the styles of other artists he admired, to study their techniques. One evening his boss discovered him finishing a pastiche of a wintry Canadian scene, à la Cornelius Krieghoff. The man offered to purchase it, and asked him to do another, for which he paid him $15 each. Keating later learned they were sold at a London Gallery for more than $3,000.

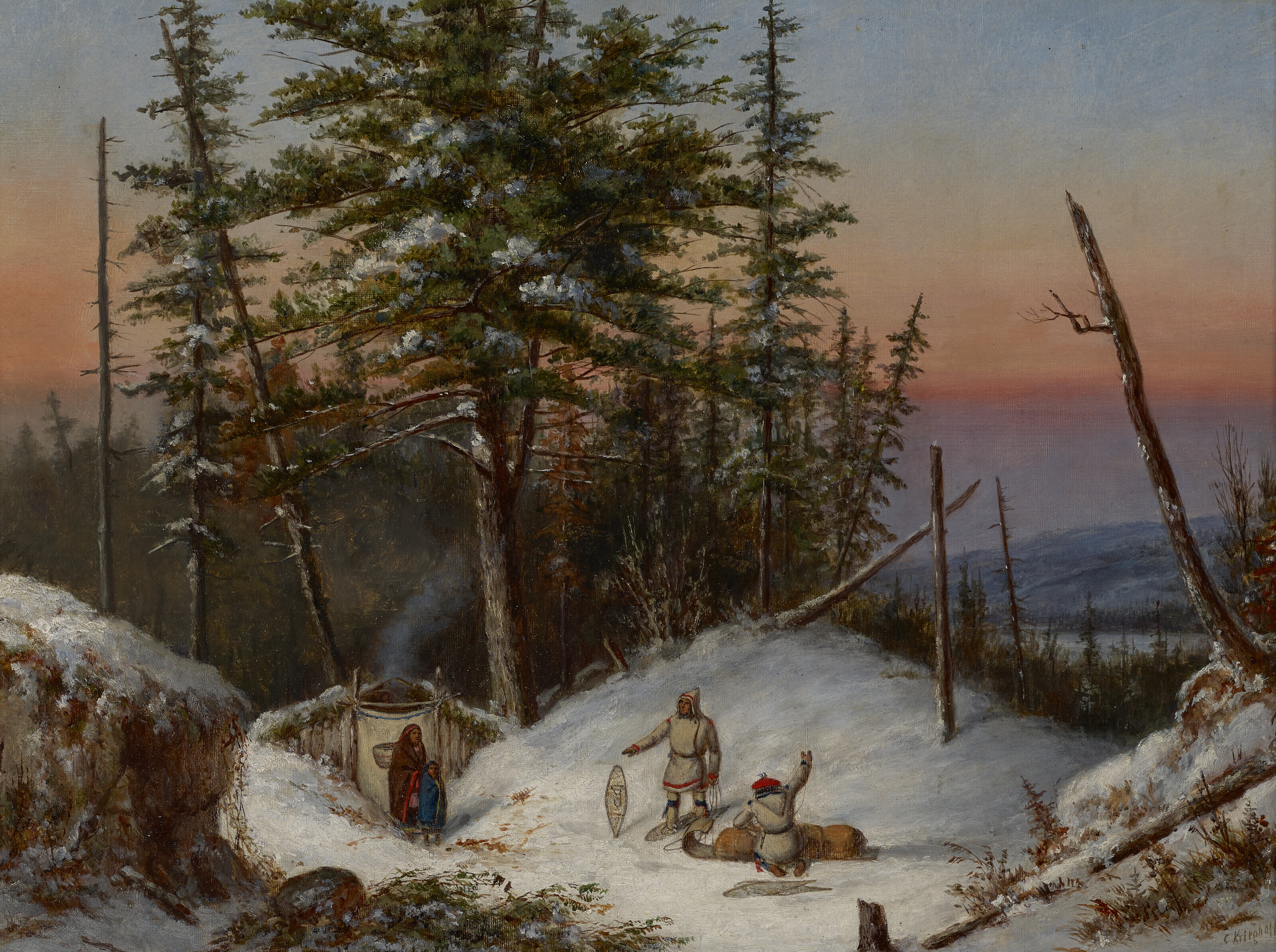
Cornelius Krieghoff: Trappers on the frontier.

He retaliated by disseminating quantities of fakes of sufficient quality to fool the experts, hoping to destabilize the system. At one point in the 1950s, so many "newly-discovered" Krieghoffs had come on the market that prices were acutely depressed, over fears many were fake, neatly achieving two of Keating's goals: to reduce the profits of greedy art dealers, and to make beautiful pictures from one of his favourite artists more affordable to the buying public. Some twenty years later, a Sotheby's expert on Canadian art lamented, due to unceasing difficulties in making a firm identification of Krieghoff's work, that instead of listing them under the artist's full name – to indicate full confidence in their authenticity – they catalogued paintings in a 1976 auction as merely, "attributed to Krieghoff". Prices however, had made a handsome recovery; they sold for $11,000–$13,000.

Keating considered himself a socialist and used his political views to rationalize his actions. He deliberately left clues to equip fellow art restorers, conservators and merchants to discover his deception. Sometimes he would put a layer of glycerine under oil paint so that when a picture would be cleaned the solvents would dissolve the glycerin and the paint layer would disintegrate, revealing the picture as a fake. Or when beginning a picture, he would paint messages on canvases in lead white that could easily be revealed with x-rays. Occasionally he found frames still labelled with Christie's catalogue numbers and would contact the auction house to learn what paintings they had contained. He would then paint similar pictures in the same artist's style and use the frames to imply a false provenance for them. He would also use modern acrylics and varnishes on paintings supposedly from previous centuries. Contemporary copyists of old masters use similar practices to guard against accusations of fraud.

== Techniques of the old masters ==
To create his many Samuel Palmer fakes he would often mix sepia with glutinous tree gum, apply thick coats of varnish. For his Rembrandt drawings he would use 18th-century paper and make walnut ink by boiling walnuts for ten hours and filtering the result through silk stockings.

He bristled at being called a forger, claiming he never truly copied any pictures, rather he did new pictures that looked like they were done by others. In a 1977 BBC documentary he described a kind of hierarchy of terms for various types of imitation:

Copy – an exact duplicate, such as those often displayed in place of an original kept safe in a vault

Repaint – according to his hierarchy, the result of heedless, heavy-handed restoration

Pastiche – a variation of an existing painting, or a new picture that mimics another artist's style

Fake – a pastiche that has been doctored up to look like an original

Forgery – a fake with another artist's signature added and false provenance provided

Though not always consistent in his own use of these distinctions, by far his favourite term for what he did was Sexton Blake. The name of the long-running fictional detective was commonly used from the early twentieth century to mean, cake. Keating revised and popularized its use as rhyming slang for fake.

Keating took advantage of a safety net major London auction houses employ in the form of their conditions of sale, which limit responsibility for the accuracy of attributions. They have three levels of catalog entries: John Constable means they believe a picture is authentic. J. Constable means they believe it to be from his school and possibly by the master. Constable means it is in his style but could be an imitation of any date.

Though nothing approaching the 2,000 fakes that Keating claimed to have produced have ever been identified, he did describe in varying levels of detail the artist; the subject matter; the media (oils on old canvases and board, acrylics, pastels, drawings and watercolours on old and modern paper); the source of inspiration (mostly books); and the time period and location (Forest Hill in the late 1930s, Kew in the 1950s and early '60s, Suffolk in the late '60s and early '70s, Tenerife from 1971-74) where he did several hundred of them. Artists he claimed to have faked in large quantities include more than 100 Cornelius Krieghoff paintings, about 80 Samuel Palmer paintings and drawings, 40-50 Constantine Guys drawings, 30-60 Degas drawings and pastels, about 20 JMW Turner watercolours, perhaps 20 Renoir charcoal drawings and pastels (plus one oil painting), quantities of Constable and Gainsborough drawings, lots of Rembrandt drawings, lots of Sisley paintings and Francesco Guardi drawings, quite a few George Rouault gouaches, a lot of Thomas Rowlandson drawings tinted with watercolour, a dozen Modigliani drawings and paintings of long-necked ladies, several Hans Holbein the Elder drawings (and one oil), several David Teniers paintings on panel, several Thomas Girtin drawings, several Edvard Munch acrylics, and several Matisse drawings, watercolours and gouaches. He also claimed to have done a half-dozen Manet oils (and two or three drawings), a half dozen Pissarro oils, some Richard Wilson drawings (and two or three oils), a few Toulouse Lautrec drawings (and one painting) and one or two pictures in the manner of Tintoretto, Rubens, Dürer, Stubbs, Goya, John Linnell and Paul Klee.

A much smaller list of fakes the police, and various art dealers and journalists were actually able to track down in the 1970s, which Keating identified as his own work, included 26 Samuel Palmers, nine Constables, eight Krieghoffs, seven Degas, seven Kees van Dongens, five Edvard Munch paintings, four Renoirs, four Constantine Guys, four Modiglianis, and one or two in the manner of Rembrandt, Francesco Gardi, Gainsborough, Goya, Linnell, Henri Fantin-Latour, Auguste Rodin, Jean Louis Forain, Toulouse Lautrec, Emile Bernard, Raoul Dufy, Wassily Kandinsky, and Frank Moss Bennett.

== Relationship with Jane Kelly ==
In the summer of 1963, 46-year-old Keating, met 16-year-old Jane Kelly, in the Railway Café at Kew Gardens Station–opposite his flat, and just across an historic footbridge from her family home. Having recently relocated from Llangyndeyrn, Wales, Kelly quickly joined a group of young people she found gathered round a charming older man perched at the end of the bar, regaling them with wild stories of war, protest, and Art World treachery. Keating gave informal painting lessons to several of them. Impressed with her keen ambition and precocious intellect, he soon took on his first and only formal mentorship, with Kelly. From early childhood, she had grown up studying a number of rare sketch books her great grandfather, Thomas Farr, had made in British Ceylon in the 1890s. The pioneering tea planter, artist, and early conservationist made detailed field drawings and vivid watercolours, which inspired Kelly to become an artist. She soon became Keating's full-time student and apprentice. Four years later, the two began a life together in Suffolk, where they started an art restoration business.

== Revealing the forger ==
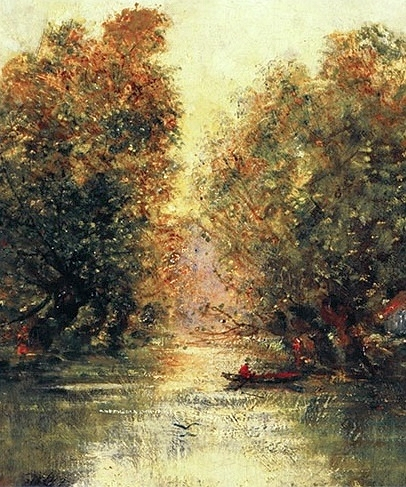
River landscape in the Porczyński Gallery in Warsaw, signed as Alfred Sisley, is claimed to be Keating's forgery

In February 1970, Geraldine Norman, sale room correspondent for The Times of London, reported the sale of a rare painting from Samuel Palmer's Shoreham period, which mainly depicted moonlit scenes of shepherds and sheep from around his home in Shoreham, Kent. A nearly life-sized photo of the picture accompanied the article. Entitled Sepham Barn, it was purchased for £9,400, by Harold Leger, of Leger Galleries, Old Bond Street in London.

A month later, The Times published a letter from art expert David Gould claiming the picture to be a fake. Mrs. Norman continued to receive reports of more new Palmer pictures appearing in the market, along with claims from David Gould that all of them were fakes. In March 1976, she began investigating them, enlisting the assistance of Palmer experts from the Ashmolean Museum, the Tate Museum, the British Museum, and the Fitzwilliam Museum, as well as author Geoffrey Grigson.

In July 1976 the first of a series of articles by Norman on fake Palmers was published on page one of The Times. Thirteen previously unknown Palmers that had appeared on the market in the past decade were all declared fake. Five of them had come from a single source: Jane Kelly. Norman was unable to reach Miss Kelly but received several phone calls with tips including one from Miss Kelly's brother, who brought photos from Keating's studio, revealing that Tom Keating was the forger she was looking for.

Soon after, she drove to East Anglia and found Keating at his studio in Lower Park, Dedham, Essex. He welcomed her inside, told her all about his life as a restorer and artist, and poured out an extensive rant about his fight against the art establishment as a working-class socialist. He initially refused to discuss anything about Samuel Palmer or Jane Kelly. A little over a week after their meeting (and a month after the first article), The Times published another article by Norman, writing about Keating's life and the many allegations of forgery against him. In response, Keating wrote a letter to The Times, saying: "I do not deny these allegations. In fact, I openly confess to having done them." He also declared that money was not his incentive. Though Norman was the one to expose him, Keating did not feel resentment towards her. Instead, he said that she was sympathetic, respectful of his radical politics, and appreciative of him as an artist. Norman's series of nine articles on Keating garnered her the British Press Awards News Reporter of the Year for 1976.

The ensuing investigation and build up to trial received expansive coverage in the London press and around the world. In the 12 months from Norman’s first exposé in July 1976, to Keating’s arrest in July 1977, The Times ran 54 stories, many on page one: "Art world seeks fakes inquiry". "Museum confirms tests show 'Palmer' is fake". "Mr. Keating identifies 28 paintings as his own work".

In the US, TIME magazine ran “Art: Palming off the Palmers.” The New York Times published "London painter and restorer admits flooding art market with forgeries", and, “Watercolorgate – Whimsey, Fakery, and Esthetic Truth”.

In January 1977, Keating visited top galleries in Canada, and the vast private collections of billionaire newspaper and television magnate, Ken Thomson, to see if they had any of his fake Cornelius Krieghoffs. The artist being something of a national favourite, the Canadian press trailed him throughout his stay. The Globe and Mail announced: "Krieghoff Imitator spots none of his fakes at art gallery", and directed readers to a CTV interview with “Tom Keating, world's greatest art forger”. Maclean's did a six-page colour spread: "Tom Keating's life is imitating art".

The Sydney Morning Herald published a detailed interview with "The Master Art Forger".

After Keating sent his mea culpa letter to The Times, in one of 17 articles on the Keating affaire, the Daily Express blazoned the top of page 1 with, "I FAKED THE LOT!". The Daily Mirror declared, "Fake artist draws in the crowds", when due to public demand, The Cecil Higgins museum in Bedford pressed Scotland Yard for the early return of a Palmer fake they had had on display for the past ten years, so they could re-hang it next to their three authentic ones. Dozens of letters to the editor appeared in the London press – a few from art dealers venting outrage; most from readers expressing amusement and delight with Keating's exploits and roguish charm.

== Trial at the Old Bailey ==
Keating and Jane Kelly were arrested in 1977, both accused of conspiracy to defraud, and obtaining payments through deception amounting to £21,416. The decision to try their case at the top criminal court in Britain was unprecedented—no art fraud case had ever been heard in Court No. 1 at the Old Bailey. It began in January 1979, and was a top daily news story in the London press for a month and a half, with The Daily Telegraph and The Guardian posting more than three dozen reports. Proclaimed by The Observer as "the best show in town, where they have been packing them in for weeks", it was periodically carried round the world via Reuters and the Associated Press.

Kelly pleaded guilty, and promised to testify against Keating. Detective Inspector Peter Goodall, the Scotland Yard Art and Antiques Squad investigator who prepared the case for the prosecution against Keating and Kelly, surprisingly gave evidence sympathetic to the latter, declaring that Keating appeared to have exerted a “Svengali-like” influence over her.

Keating pleaded innocent, claiming that he had never intentionally defrauded anyone, and had left clues that ought to have revealed his deceptions to any expert who examined them. His defence barrister, Jeremy Hutchinson, QC, mounted a strong case intended to "arouse in the minds of the jury a suspicion that the greedy dealers were well aware that the works might not be genuine, but that the possibility of making a substantial profit overcame their scruples." He called to the witness box many of the same art experts Mrs. Norman consulted for her exposé, one of whom echoed Hutchinson's colourful suggestion that a bat hovering in the background of one of Keating's Palmer pastiches looked "more like a Boeing 707". His final witness was Brian Sewell, "Britain's most famous and controversial art critic" who later said, "my role was to pour cold water on the art establishment. As far as I could see, it was the establishment which should be in the dock, not Tom Keating, for being so credulous and setting themselves up as experts when they had been so easily seduced."

Kelly received a felony conviction, for obtaining money by deception, and a was given an 18-month custodial sentence, suspended for two years. After two days giving evidence, Keating was hospitalised for a motorbike accident. He returned for a third day in court, during which he collapsed in the witness box, and was returned to hospital. He was released without charge two weeks later due to failing health. The prosecutor dropped the case, declaring nolle prosequi.

== Crusader vindicated ==
The same year Keating was arrested (1977), he published his autobiography with Geraldine and Frank Norman. A 2005 article in The Guardian stated that after the trial was halted, "the public warmed to him, believing him a charming old rogue." Years of chain smoking and the effects of breathing the fumes of chemicals used in art restoring, such as ammonia, turpentine and methyl alcohol, together with the stress induced by the court case, had taken their toll. Through 1982 and 1983, however, Keating rallied at the prospect of finally fulfilling a long-held ambition to be a teacher; to encourage others to paint. Though still in fragile health, he accepted a proposal to star in a (UK) Channel 4 television series called Tom Keating on Painters (see more below).

A year before his death, Keating stated in a television interview that in his opinion, he was not an especially good painter. Yet many art collectors and celebrities, such as the ex-heavyweight boxer Henry Cooper, had already begun to collect his work. In December 1983, hoping to raise sufficient funds to buy himself a new cottage, Keating sent 137 of his pictures to be auctioned at Christie's in London. In a significant policy change—selling commercial pictures by a self-confessed faker—they accepted them, signed by Keating, but "in the style of" other artists. Exceeding the wildest expectations of auctioneer David Collins, nearly 800 people packed the sales room, and every lot was sold, raising £72,000. The top price was £5,500 for his Hay Wain in Reverse, which had been featured in the "Constable" episode of his television series. He never received the proceeds, having died of a heart attack two months later, aged 66.

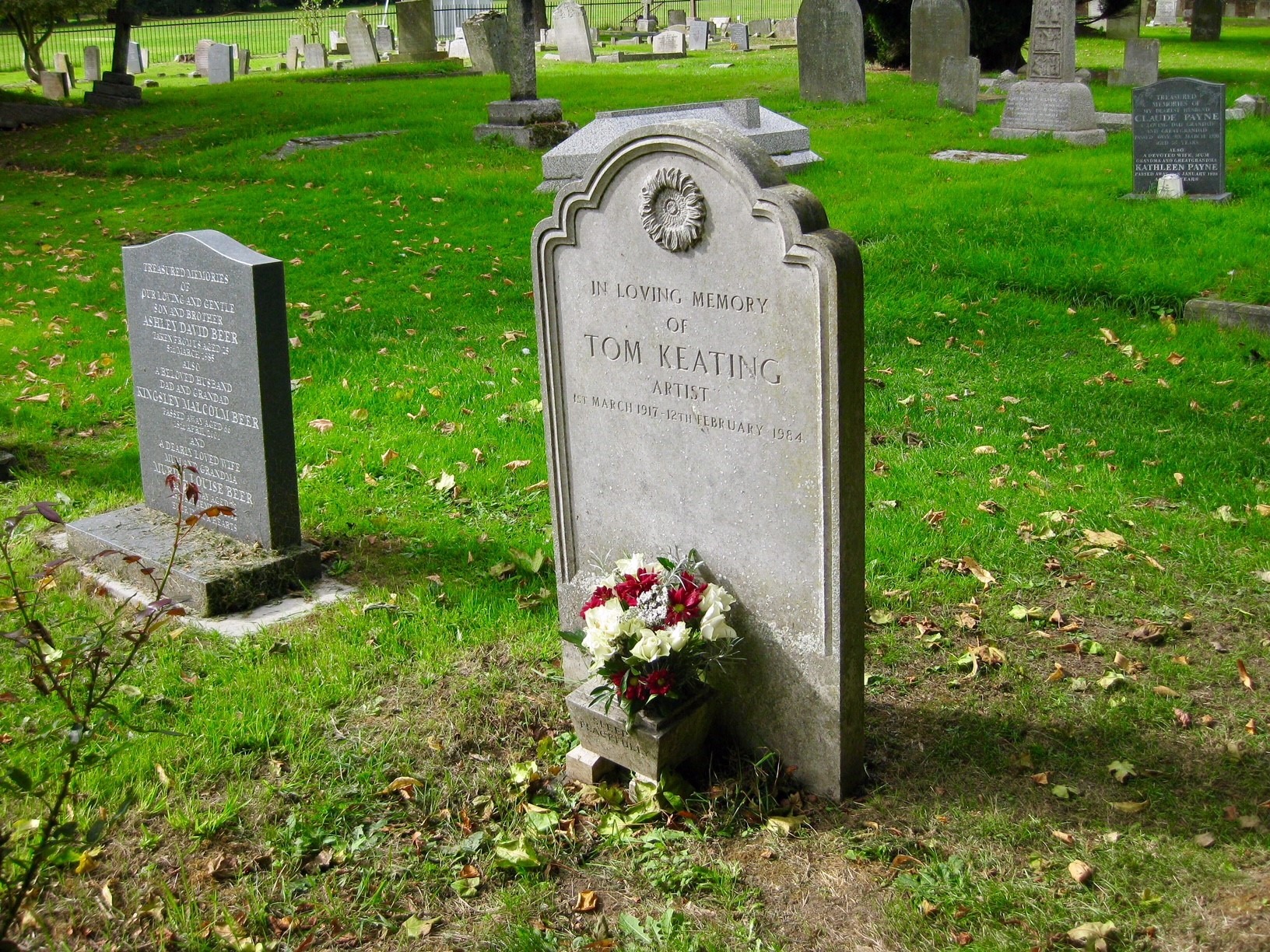
The grave of Tom Keating in the churchyard of St Mary the Virgin, Dedham, Essex

Keating is buried in the churchyard of St Mary the Virgin at Dedham (a scene painted numerous times by Sir Alfred Munnings). His last painting, The Angel of Dedham, can be found in the church's secured Muniment Library.

Five more auctions of his works were held. In September 1984, more than a thousand people squeezed into Christie's South Kensington sale rooms to bid on 202 paintings and sketches put up for sale by his son and daughter. The event fetched £274,000 – about 20 times higher than the printed estimates in the catalogue. A 1983 picture called Monet and his Family in their Houseboat sold for £16,000. A Sisley imitation brought £8,500. A self-portrait "after the style of" Rembrandt yielded £7,500. Several others that had been expected to fetch between £200 and £400, including pastiches of Renoir and Van Gogh, went for £5,000 or £6,000. Christie's auctioneer David Collins later said: "The prices paid represented the ground swell of public support for Keating. He was a talented artist and a great character in the art world."

In December 1989, the last works from Keating's studio raised £166,000 in a sale at Bonhams, including a record price for a Keating—£26,400 for his pastiche of Turner's The Fighting Temeraire. In December 1990, another sale at Bonhams brought £109,000 for 51 paintings. A third sale at Bonhams in August 1991 featured some Keatings alongside paintings by forger Elmyr de Hory.

The final sale held in December 1998 by Vost's of Newmarket, of 85 mainly small, unframed watercolours, pastels and drawings, and a few oil paintings, came from the estate of Jane Kelly, who died of brain cancer in 1992. It was held at Layer Marney Tower, not far from Keating's old studio. More than 700 people turned up. A sale expected to raise £15,000 at the most, brought £128,000. Odalisque, in the manner of Matisse, a portrait of Kelly dressed as a Turkish concubine, fetched £6,700. The top price of £7,500 was paid for At the races, in the manner of Degas, which had an estimated price of only £400. A Modigliani pastiche brought £5,800; an oil self-portrait fetched £5,000.

Keating's work has itself been faked. The 2005 Guardian article states: "Dodgy paintings in Keating's original style, proudly bearing what looks like his signature, are finding their way into the market. If they manage to fool, they can claim £5,000 to £10,000. But if uncovered they are virtually worthless, much like Keating's 20 years ago. If you can pick them up for next to nothing, they may be a better investment than an original Keating counterfeit."

== Works ==
- Major restoration of the Louis Laguerre murals depicting the Battle of Blenheim in the West Staircase at Marlborough House.
- The Hay Wain in Reverse, his best known painting, is a pastiche of John Constable's celebrated, The Hay Wain. It is reportedly on display in the Granary Barn and Museum in Flatford.
- Turner at Greenwich, the reverse Temeraire shown in the Turner episode of Tom Keating On Painters.
- A Barn at Shoreham, a Samuel Palmer pastiche purchased by the Cecil Higgins Museum in Bedford in 1965, on advice by Edward Croft Murray, the Keeper of Pictures at the British Museum, that it was authentic. They took it down in August 1976 when it was discovered to be a Keating fake. They rehung it four months later. Museum trustees commented 'that there seemed to be more public interest in the drawing now it was known to be a fake than there had been in the genuine article.' A Barn at Shoreham remains on view in the museum's art store.
- A modest painting of the Greek sun god Helios in his chariot adorns a sign over The Sun Inn, in Dedham, Essex.

== Television series ==
=== A Picture of Tom Keating ===
Subtitled An exclusive study of a master forger, this BBC1 special broadcast on 3 May 1977, featured an interview of Keating in his studio, demonstrating how he produced fakes of Renoir, Degas and Palmer. He claimed he duped the so-called experts because he wanted to expose the dubious practices of art dealers. He also discussed his relationship with Jane Kelly, and their restoration business at Wattisfield Hall, in East Anglia, and later at Vilaflor in Tenerife.

The programme was rebroadcast on BBC2 on 6 August 1979, with a new sequence that covered Keating's trial in February.

=== Tom Keating On Painters ===
Keating's award-winning first educational series began airing on 4 November 1982, two days after the launch of Britain's fourth television station. Channel 4 enticed viewers by inviting them to: "Watch the great 16th century Italian painter Tom Keating (who) believes the spirits of the Old Masters sometimes enter him as he works on a canvas. Tonight, in the first of a series, watch Titian paint 'Tarquin and Lucretia' through Keating."

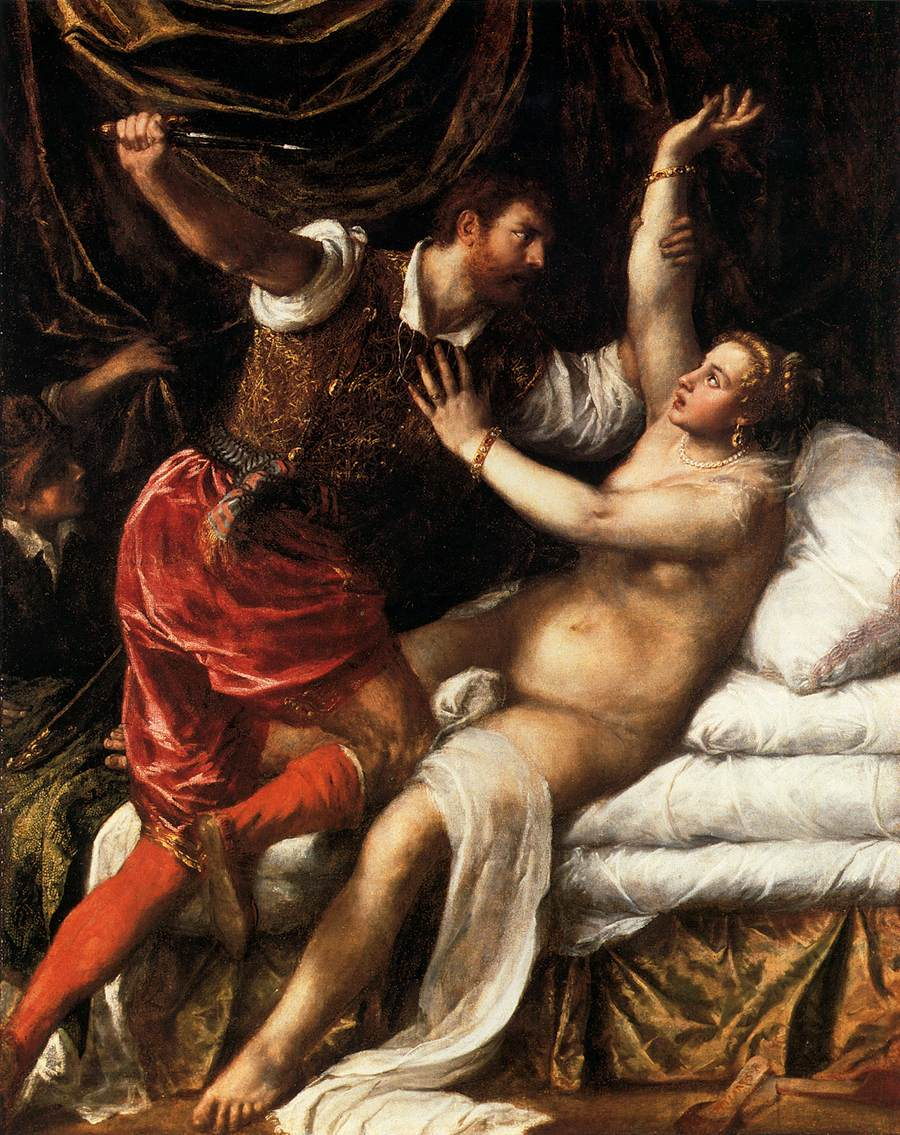
Titian: Tarquin and Lucretia, 1571

In each half-hour episode, filmed in his private studio in Dedham, a soft-spoken Keating displayed a depth of knowledge and range of technical skills that astonished many viewers. A Times television critic commenting on the Rembrandt episode wrote: "Tom Keating does more than just break new ground in art appreciation. Other art experts limit themselves to indicating areas of great paintings and explaining this, that, and the other. Mr. Keating goes one better by first putting himself into the Old Master's shoes, then insinuating himself into their minds, and finally putting paint to canvas with an uncanny command of the original style. Instruction by example: that is the Keating approach."

The show was the realisation of a lifelong yearning to pass on to others the Old Master techniques he had taught himself. Thousands of art teachers and students continue to study them. In 2006, television personality Magnus Magnusson compared its popularity with Kenneth Clark's 1969 BBC series Civilisation.

He would begin each episode with a brief life history of the artist, including aesthetic influences and interactions with other famous painters, then quickly demonstrate the compositional development, sketching and painting techniques of one of his favourite mentors, each among the most revered fine artists in history. In March the following year, the programme captured the Broadcasting Press Guild's award for "Best on-screen performance in a non-acting role" for Keating. Both series were released on VHS in 1983.

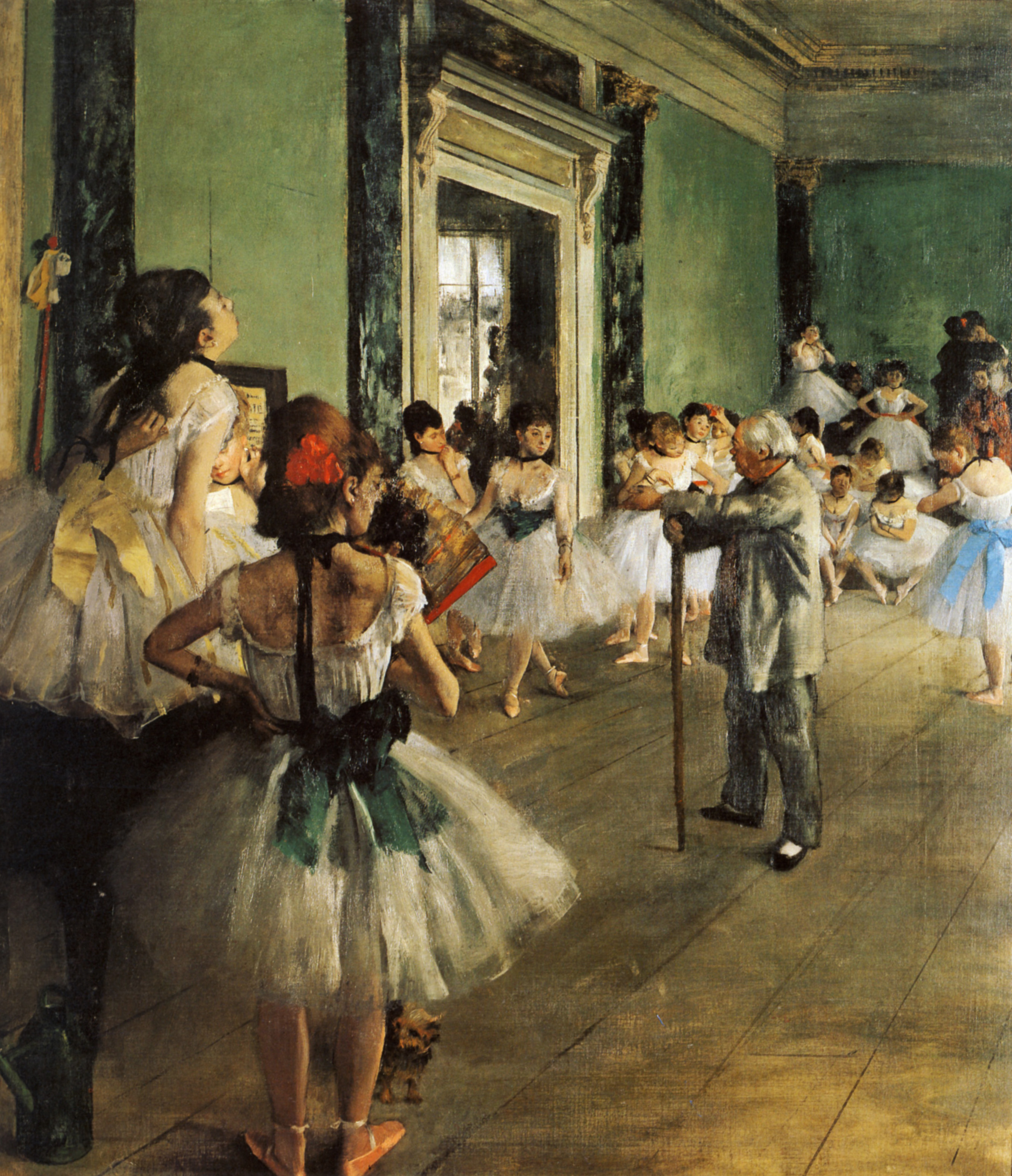
Degas: The Ballet Class, 1874

"Turner" – "In his day people had a need, an urge to escape the ugliness of life," Keating explains. "They hid themselves in their paintings, looking at them. So he created another world of colour, magic and mystery." Keating draws and paints a reverse rendering of The Fighting Temeraire.

"Titian" – Keating illustrates Titian's multilayered painting techniques by creating a copy of Tarquin and Lucretia.

"Constable" – Keating reviews the history of the making of The Hay Wain. Then recreates another version of his Hay Wain in Reverse.

"Rembrandt" – Keating paints a pastiche combining a Rembrandt self-portrait with a portrait of his son Titus.

"Degas" – Keating demonstrates the making of The Ballet Class, in pastel.

"Restoration" – Keating gives viewers a tour of the Louis Laguerre murals he restored in the West Staircase at Marlborough House, which depict the Battle of Blenheim. He then retreats to The Marlborough Head, his local pub in Dedham, to collect an old landscape painting the landlord has asked him to clean, quipping: "He's paying me one pint a day for the next 14 years." Back in his studio, he demonstrates how to carefully remove the picture from its frame, strip off the grimy old varnish, and apply a fresh coat.

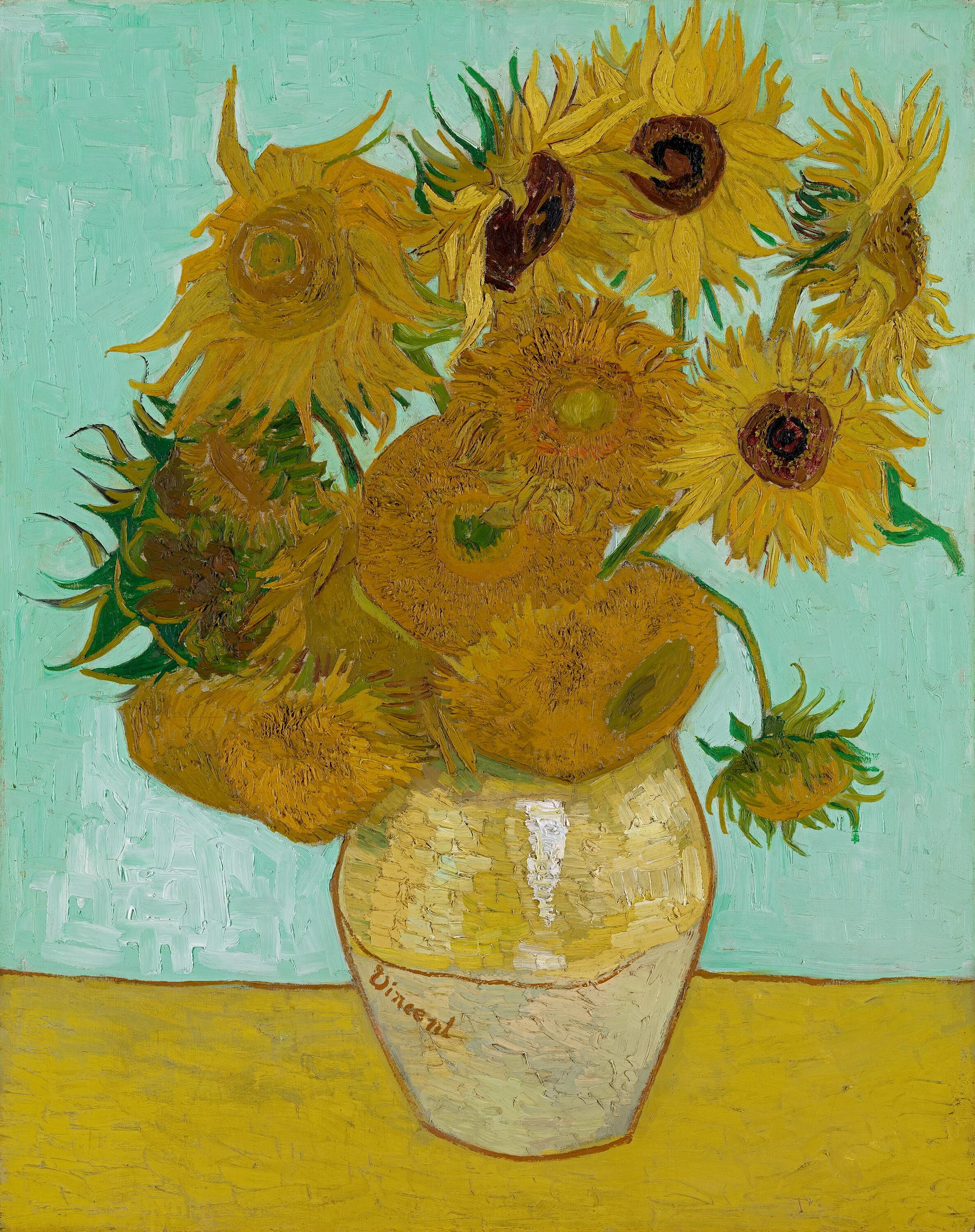
Van Gogh: Sunflowers, 1888

=== Tom Keating On Impressionism ===
"Rousseau, Boudin, Pissarro" – In the first episode of his second instructional series, Keating reviews the history of the development of French Impressionism, and how various Impressionists influenced one another. He demonstrates the creation of en plain air views of the forest of Fontainebleau, in the manner of Rousseau; a seaside promenade in the style of Boudin; and a view through wispy trees of a house in the countryside, in the mode of Pissarro.

"Manet" – Keating does a copy of Manet's nude, Olympia.

"Monet" - Keating does a copy of Vétheuil in Winter, demonstrating effects Monet captured by painting the village from his boat on an icy River Seine.

"Renoir" – Working with a live model, Keating begins a pastiche of a portrait of young lady, seated, with a letter and a vase of flowers.

"Van Gogh" – A vase of fake flowers at his side, Keating creates a "Sunflowers" still-life, combined with, from memory, a "self-portrait" of Vincent. In place of the usual brief introduction, he presents the most heartfelt and comprehensive biography of the series, right through the entire episode. He suggests the genius was not mad, but merely exceptionally sensitive, and depressed over arguments with Theo, but otherwise reacting normally to pain, despair, and loneliness. “He had these intense eyes, emphasised by ginger eyebrows and red hair, giving him this appearance…this rather frightening expression, that is often mistaken for madness… We lost him because of the stupidity of people. And he shot himself, when he should've gone out, I think, and shot a few art dealers…" who soon began making "a king's ransom" from his pictures.

"Cezanne" – Keating does a still-life of wine and fresh fruit.

== In popular culture ==
In the 2002 film The Good Thief, Nick Nolte's character claims to own a painting that Picasso did for him after losing a bet, and when it is exposed as a fake, he claims it was painted for him by Keating after meeting him in a betting shop.

The fourth track, titled "Judas Unrepentant", on progressive rock band Big Big Train's 2012 album English Electric (Part One) is based on the life of Keating as an artist. According to the blog of Big Big Train vocalist David Longdon, the song walks through Keating's artistic life from his time as a restorer to his death and posthumous fame.

Keating's early struggles over ambition, integrity, and the true meaning of artistic genius with his student and partner in crime, Jane Kelly, are depicted in the historical fiction, The Joker's Hand, Part I, Secret Techniques of the Old Masters.
