= Cornelius Krieghoff =

Dutch painter (1815–1872)

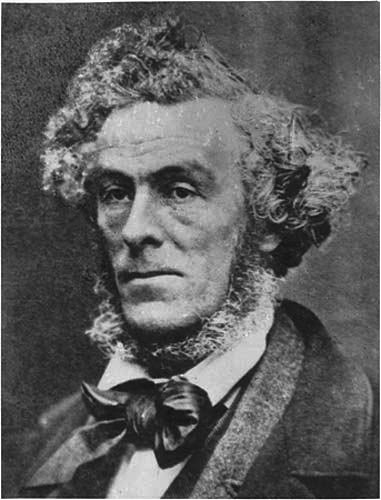
- Cornelius Krieghoff photographed by M.O. Hammond
- Born: June 19, 1815; Amsterdam, Kingdom of the Netherlands
- Died: March 5, 1872 (aged 56); Chicago, Illinois
- Education: Michel Martin Drolling
- Known for: Painter
- Notable work: The Toll Gate, 1859
- Spouse: Émilie Gauthier (m. 1837)

Cornelius David Krieghoff (June 19, 1815 – March 5, 1872) was a Dutch-born Canadian-American painter of the 19th century. He is best known for his paintings of Canadian genre scenes involving landscapes and outdoor life, which were as sought after in his own time as they are today. He painted many winter scenes, some in several variants (e.g. Running the Toll). He painted in Quebec City from 1853 to 1864 and 1870 to 1872, creating a prolific portfolio of landscape and genre paintings.

== Life and career ==
Krieghoff was born in Amsterdam, Kingdom of the Netherlands. When Cornelius was a boy, his father Johann Ernst Krieghoff returned to Germany (Krieghoff was likely German extraction via Lorenz Krieghoff of Thuringia) and worked for Wilhem Sattler to establish a wallpaper factory. His family was given accommodations in Schloss Mainberg, a 12th-century castle owned by Sattler, situated overlooking the Main River. He was initially taught by his father and then entered the Academy of Fine Arts in Germany about 1830. He moved to New York in 1836, and enlisted in the First Regiment of Artillery in the United States Army in 1837. While in the army, he made sketches of the Second Seminole War. He was discharged as Corporal from the army in 1840. Krieghoff traveled to Paris in 1844, where he copied masterpieces at the Louvre under the direction of Michel Martin Drolling (1789–1851).

With his wife, Émilie Gauthier, he moved to Montreal around 1846 and participated in the founding of the Montreal Society of Artists in 1847. While in Montreal, he befriended the Mohawks living on the Kahnawake Indian Reservation and made many sketches of them from which he later produced oil paintings.

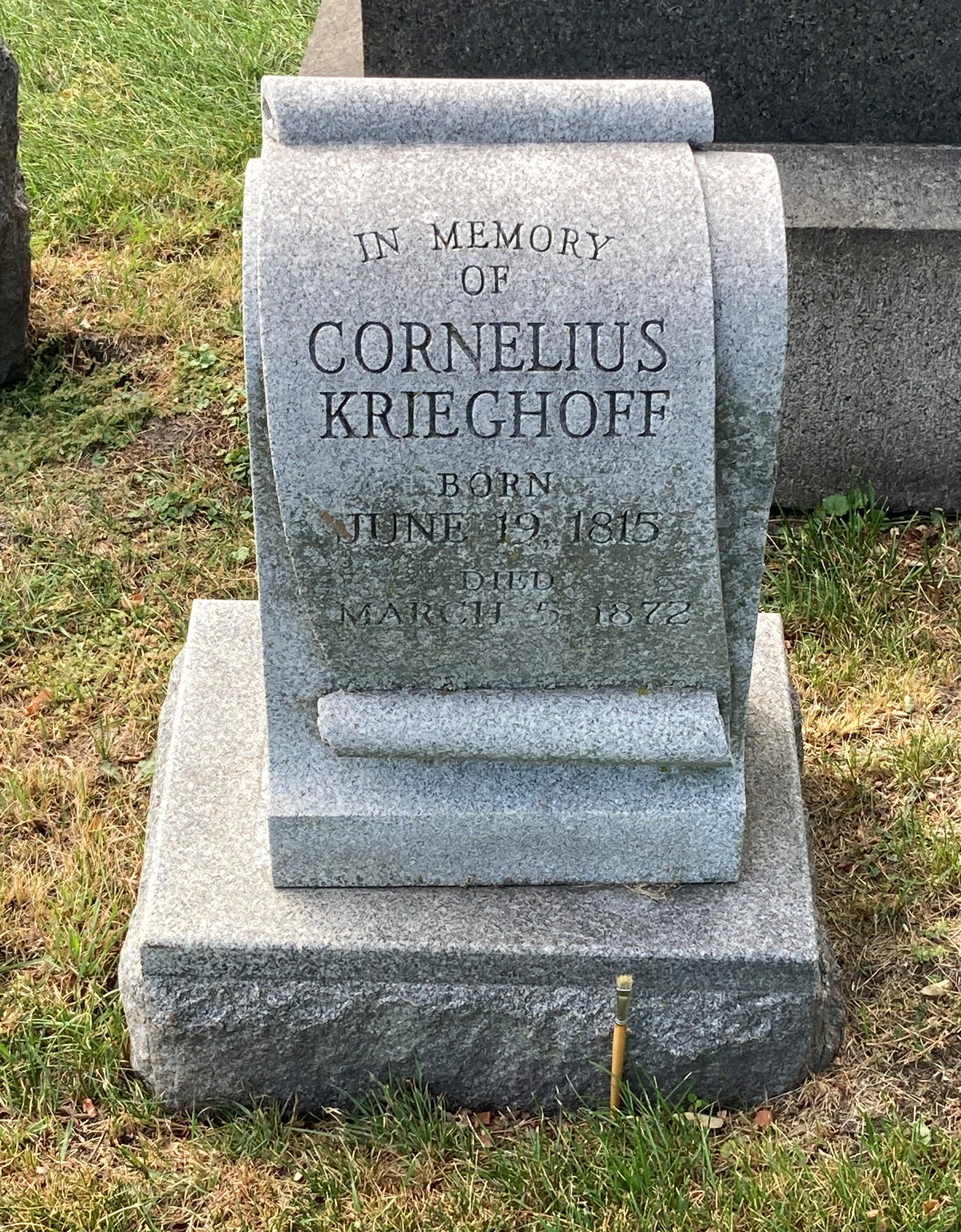
Krieghoff's grave at Graceland Cemetery

He and his family (daughter Emily) moved to Quebec City in 1853. He returned to Europe in 1854, visiting Italy and Germany. In 1855, he returned to Canada. He served for a short time in the Volunteer Militia Company of Engineers, (a Canadian Militia unit in Hochelaga, Montreal), then lived in Europe from 1863 to 1868 and moved to Chicago to retire. Throughout his time in Canada, Krieghoff painted many genre scenes and landscapes. He was particularly skilled at capturing the essence of the Canadian landscapes he visited, such as Montmorency Falls and Lake St. Charles. His paintings—naturalistic scenes with immense detail—depict life in nineteenth century Quebec, including activities such as trading, travelling, industry, and city life.

He died in Chicago on March 5, 1872, at the age of 56 and is buried in Graceland Cemetery in Chicago. A decade later, on June 8, 1881, the Great Quebec Fire destroyed many of the sketches he had done at the time of his service In the First Regiment of Artillery in Florida, which were owned at the time by John S. Budden, who had lived with the artist for thirteen years.

According to Charles C. Hill, the former Curator of Canadian Art at the National Gallery of Canada, "Krieghoff was the first Canadian artist to interpret in oils... the splendour of our waterfalls, and the hardships and daily life of people living on the edge of new frontiers".

== Collections ==
Public collections holding works by Cornelius Krieghoff include the Art Gallery of Hamilton (Hamilton, Canada), the Art Gallery of Ontario (Toronto, Canada), the Beaverbrook Art Gallery (Fredericton, Canada), the Brooklyn Museum (New York City), the Glenbow Museum (Calgary, Canada), the McCord Museum (Montreal, Canada), the Montreal Museum of Fine Arts (Montreal, Canada), Musée national des beaux-arts du Québec (Quebec, Canada), the National Gallery of Canada (Ottawa, Canada), the New York Public Library (New York City), the Rockwell Museum (Corning, New York), the Winnipeg Art Gallery (Winnipeg, Canada) and the Art Gallery of Nova Scotia (Halifax, Canada).

The greatest accumulation of Krieghoff paintings ever assembled, at over two hundred, was once part of the vast private collection of billionaire newspaper and television magnate, Ken Thomson and is in the Thomson Collection on view at the Art Gallery of Ontario today.

In February 1977, Thomson, Canada’s top fine art collector, suddenly found his collection had become a top news story in several of his own papers—from The Globe and Mail in Toronto, to The Times of London—after quietly inviting English art forger Tom Keating to come to his top floor office at Thomson Tower to check if any of his cherished Krieghoffs were fakes. Keating was under investigation by the Art and Antiques squad at Scotland Yard for selling several fake Krieghoffs in the UK, and he claimed to have painted several hundred of them, mostly in the 1950s.

Curators at the Art Gallery of Ontario (to whom Thomson later donated nearly two thousand artworks worth over (US) three hundred million dollars) held their breath when, media herd in tow, their collection was inspected by the notorious art forger. Keating denied finding any of his pastiches in Thomson's collection, nor at the AGO, nor at any of several other Canadian fine art institutions he carefully scrutinized. He professed relief that his vendetta against greedy art merchants had not tarnished the fine collections he felt privileged to tour and study over the course of his three-week visit. In February 1979, while giving evidence in his art fraud trial at the Old Bailey, he did say he was told in the 1950s that seventeen Krieghoffs in Lord Beaverbrook's collection were fakes by him. Asked to come inspect them, he refused, saying: 'Why waste the money? Try X-rays'.

== Recognition ==
In 1955, the National Film Board of Canada released the award-winning documentary The Jolifou Inn. The 10-minute film, directed by Colin Low and produced by Tom Daly, depicts 19th-century Québec life, as Krieghoff would have seen it, and uses his work to illustrate his source of inspiration.

On November 29, 1972, Canada Post issued 'Cornelius Krieghoff, painter, 1815–1872' designed by William Rueter based on a painting "The Blacksmith's Shop" (1871), by Cornelius Krieghoff in the Art Gallery of Ontario, Toronto, Ontario. The 8¢ stamps are perforated 11 and were printed by British American Bank Note Company.

On July 7, 2000, Canada Post issued 'The Artist at Niagara, 1858, Cornelius Krieghoff' in the Masterpieces of Canadian art series. The stamp was designed by Pierre-Yves Pelletier based on an oil painting "The Artist at Niagara" (1858) by Cornelius Krieghoff in the Art Gallery of Ontario, Toronto, Ontario. The 95¢ stamps are perforated 13 x 13.5 mm and were printed by Ashton-Potter Limited.

== Auction record ==
The auction record for a painting by Cornelius Krieghoff is $570,000 Canadian. This record was set by Mail boat landing at Quebec, a 17 by 24 inch oil painting on canvas sold November 20, 2006, at Sotheby's & Ritchies (Toronto).

== Gallery ==
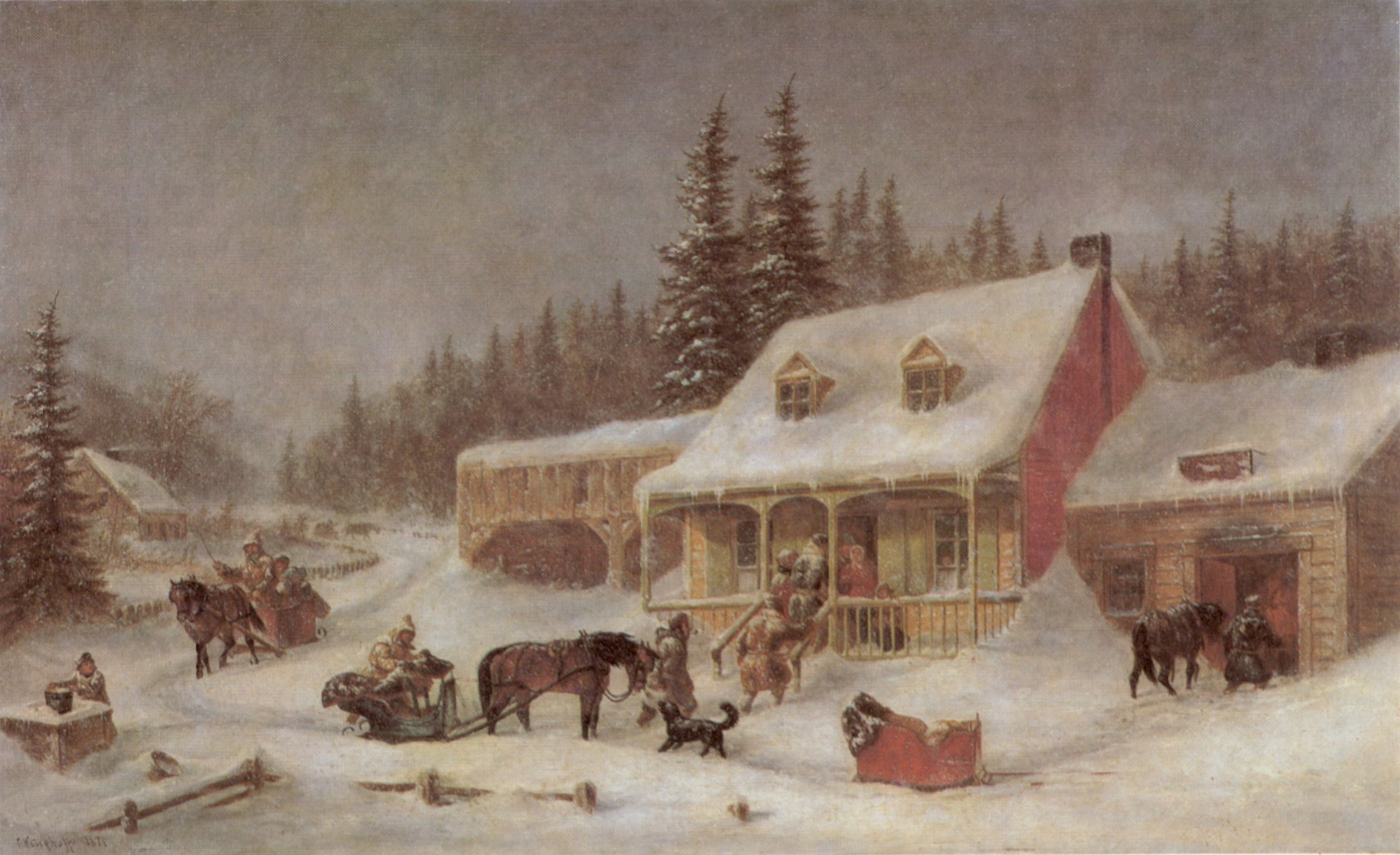
The Blacksmith's Shop, oil on canvas, 22 x 36 in, 1871, Art Gallery of Ontario

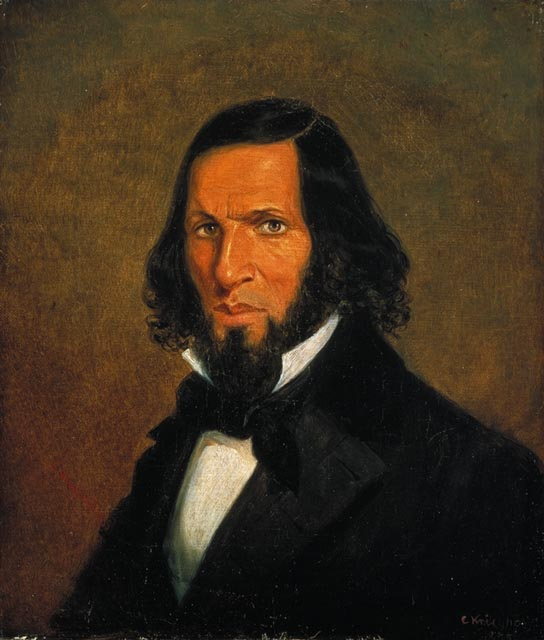
Self-portrait, 1855, National Gallery of Canada

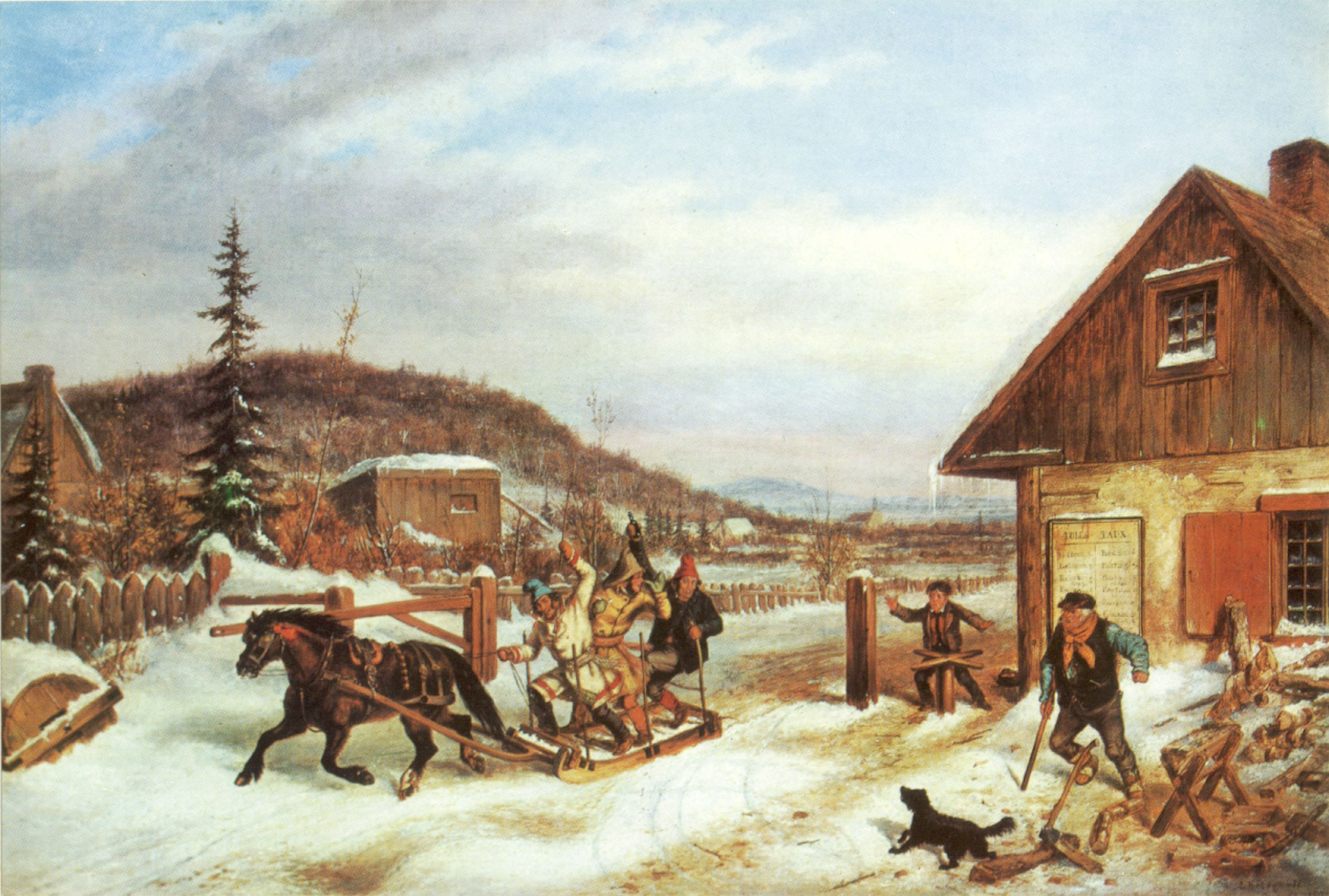
The Toll Gate, oil on canvas painting, 1859

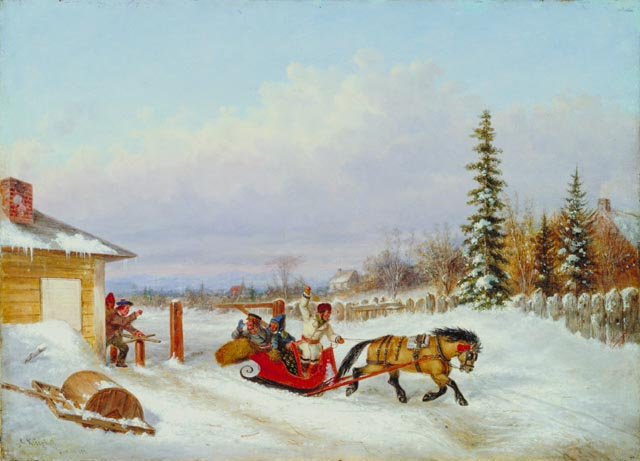
The Toll Gate, oil on canvas, 1861, National Gallery

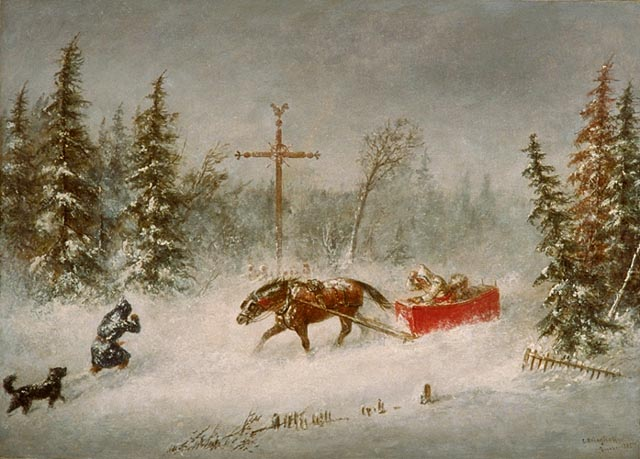
The Blizzard, oil on canvas, 1857, National Gallery

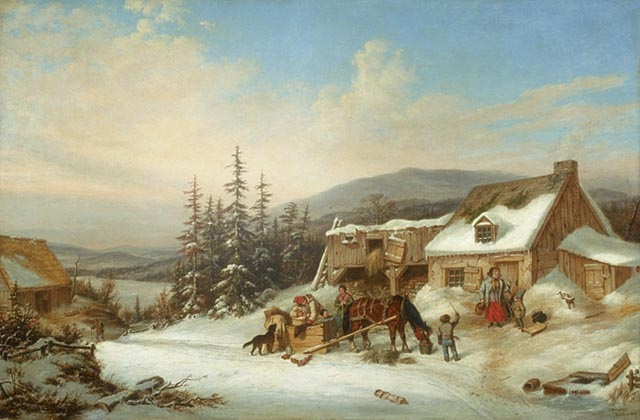
The Habitant Farm, oil on canvas, 1856, National Gallery

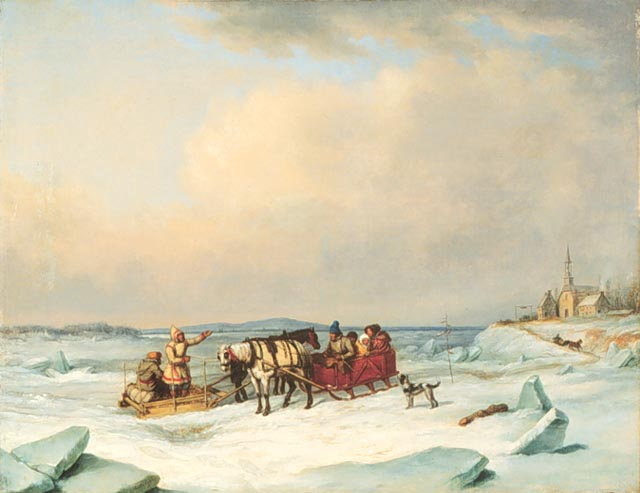
The Ice Bridge at Longue-Pointe, 1847–1848, National Gallery

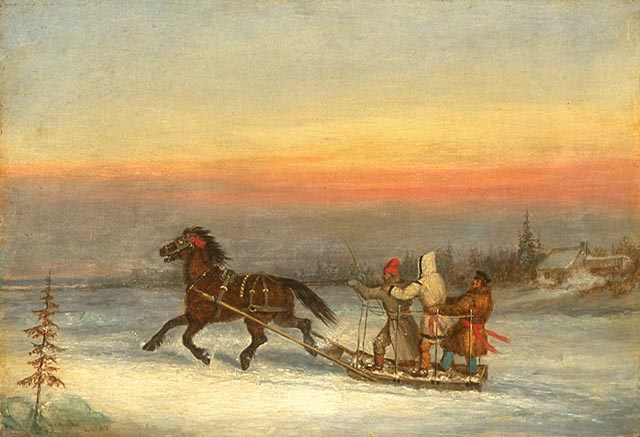
The River Road, oil on canvas, 1855, National Gallery

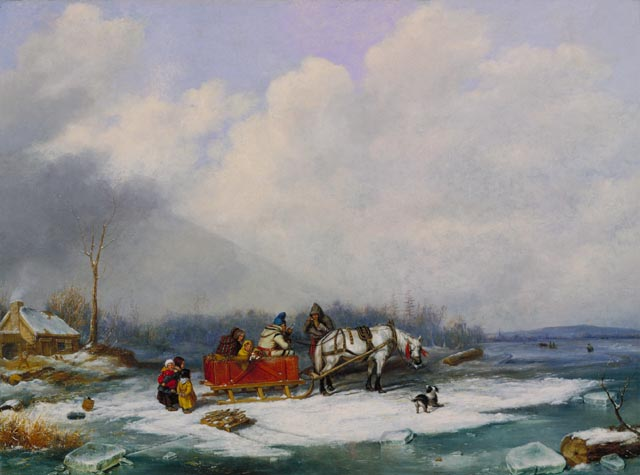
Winter Landscape, oil on canvas, 1849, National Gallery

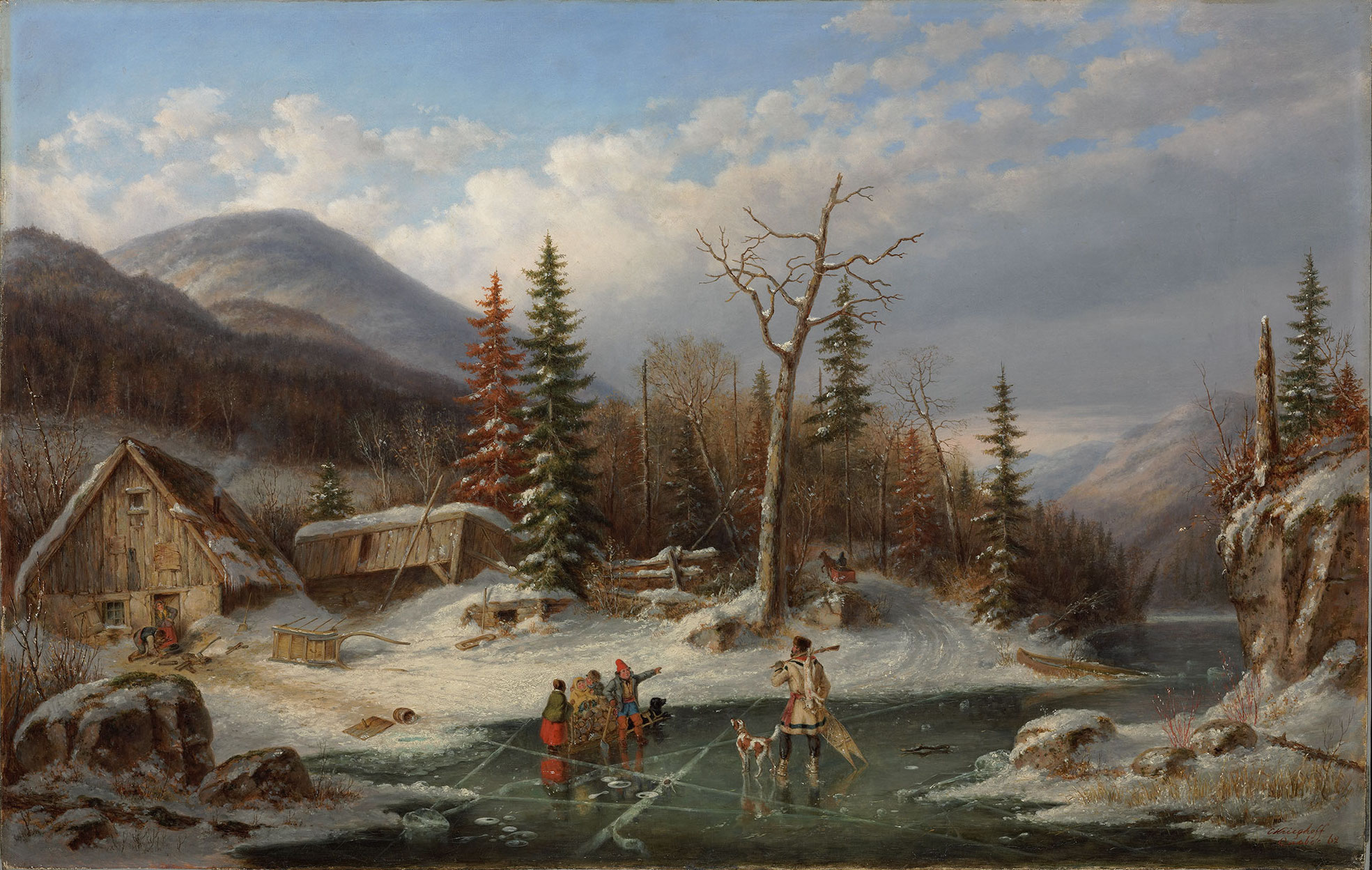
Winter Landscape, Laval, oil on canvas, 1862, National Gallery

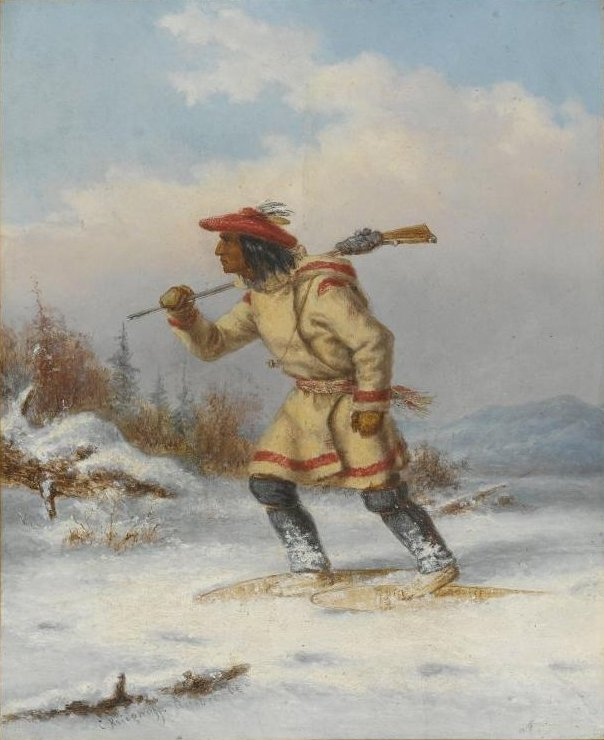
Following the Moose, oil on canvas, ca. 1860, 11 x 9.5 in., Brooklyn Museum

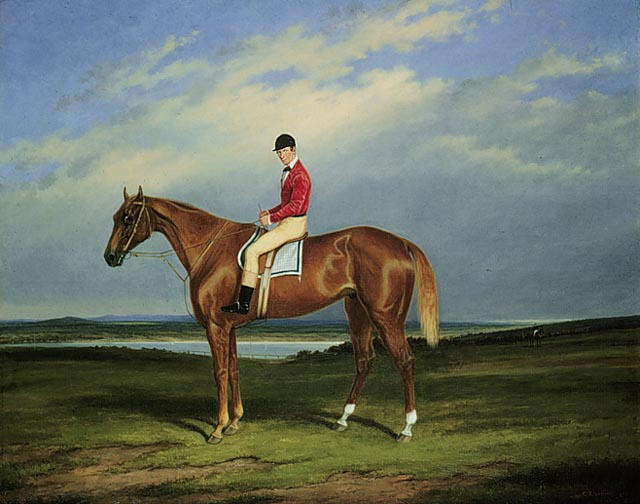
Fraser with Mr. Miller Up, oil on canvas, 1854, National Gallery

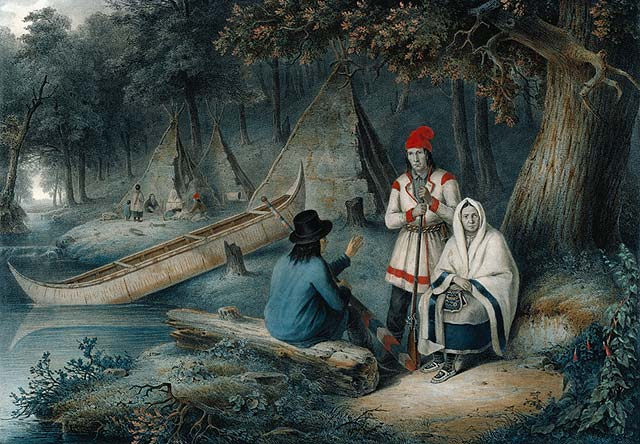
Indian Wigwam in Lower Canada, lithograph with watercolor on wove paper

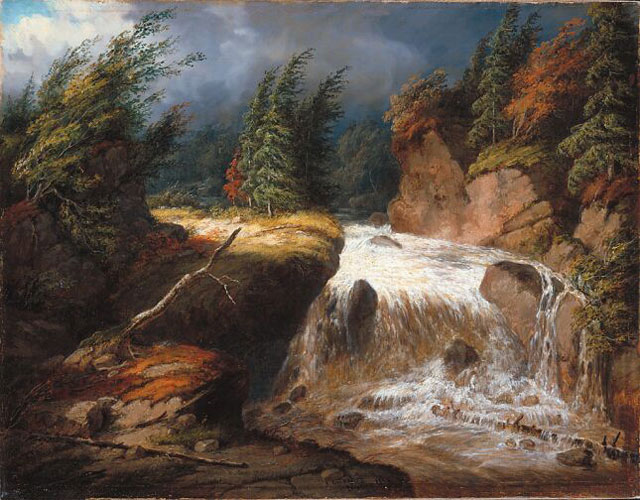
The Passing Storm, Saint-Ferréol, oil on canvas, 1854, National Gallery

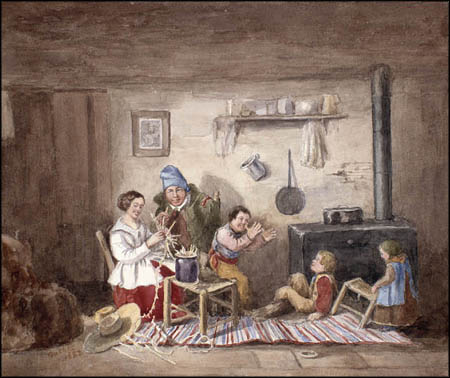
Habitants, 1852

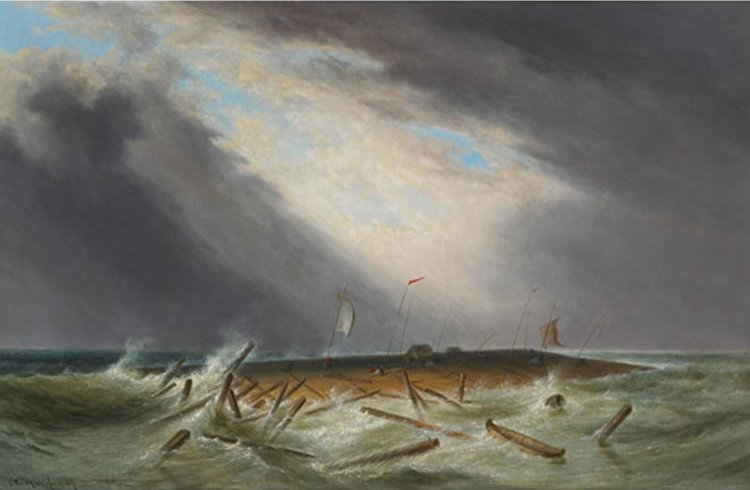
Lumber Raft on the St. Lawrence, 1867

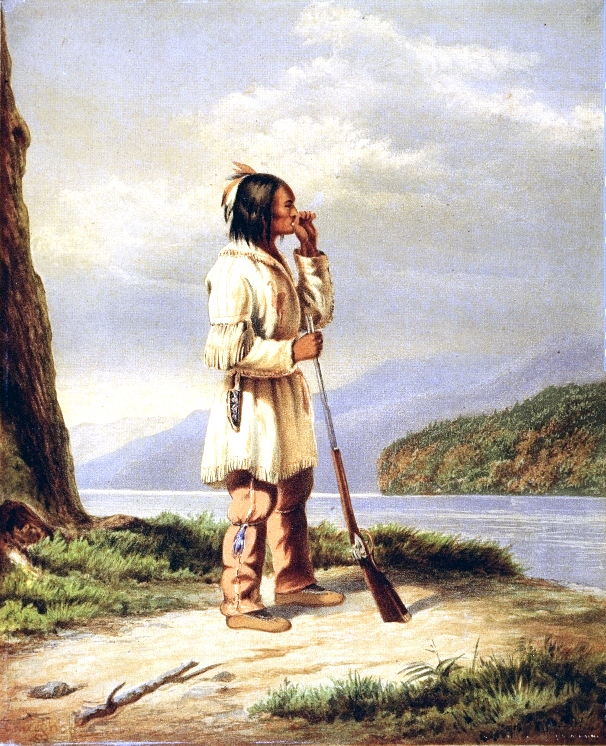
Print, Wyandot hunter calling a moose, about 1868

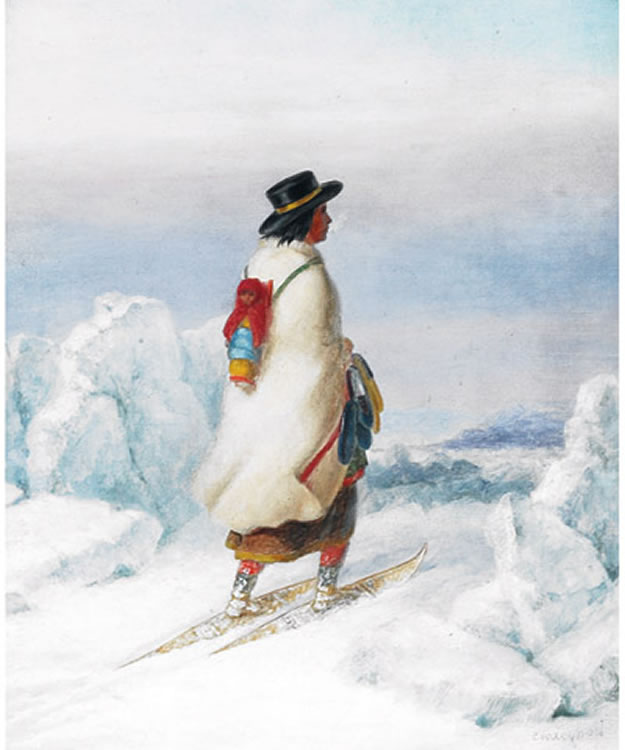
Indian Woman Moccasin Seller

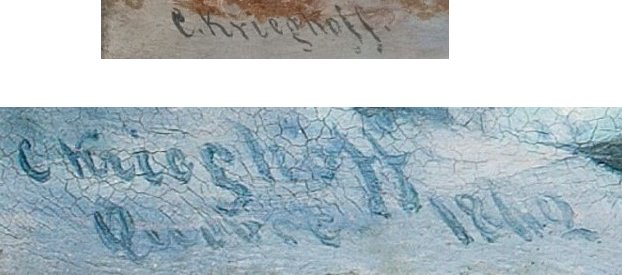
Signatures
