= Bromley High School =

Location
- Blackbrook Lane; Bromley, London, BR1 2TW; England
- 51.3953°N 0.05713°E

Information
- Type: Private day school
- Motto: Fides et Opera
- Established: 1883
- Local authority: Bromley
- Department for Education URN: 525195 Tables
- Headmistress: Emily Codling
- Religious head: N/A
- Age: 4 to 18
- Enrolment: 890~
- Colour
- Publication: High Flyer
- Website: http://www.bromleyhigh.gdst.net/

Bromley High School is a girls' private day school located in Bickley, Greater London, part of the Girls' Day School Trust. Originally located in the middle of Bromley, in 1981 it relocated to occupy new buildings set in 24 acres (9.7 ha) of grounds and playing fields.

The Good Schools Guide describes the school: "Cool calm atmosphere pervades the corridors which are lined with notice boards announcing forthcoming events and successes. General impression is of a busy and active school."

== History ==
Bromley High School was opened on 18 January 1883 and was the second school founded by the Girls' Public Day School Trust (now Girls' Day School Trust). At that time, Bromley was "a small country town, surrounded by pleasant woods and meadows". The establishment of the school marked the first public recognition in Bromley of the importance of higher education for girls.

The school celebrated its 125th anniversary in 2008. A special concert was held at the Royal Albert Hall to mark the occasion.

In 2008 a pupil in Year 11 was chosen to represent Great Britain at the opening of the Paralympic Games in Beijing.

The author Richmal Crompton was a teacher at the school from c.1917 or 1918.

== Academics ==
Bromley High has traditionally had an excellent academic record as one of the area's top performing independent schools. In 2009, it broke its record in the A Levels with 85.5% of candidates scoring A-B grades.

== Notable former pupils ==
=== Academic and education ===
- Professor Dame Marilyn Strathern, DBE MA PHD MBA, feminist anthropologist who has worked largely with the natives of Papua New Guinea; Mistress of Girton College, Cambridge, 1998–2009 (BHS 1952–59)

=== Arts ===
- Hilary Davies, poet, critic and translator
- Sarah Gibb, illustrator
- Tilly Keeper, BHS class of 2015, actor, plays Louise Mitchell in EastEnders
- Richmal Crompton Lambourn, BA, teacher, author, Senior Classics Mistress at Bromley High until 1923; author of the Just William stories
- Gillian Lynne, CBE, dancer/choreographer
- Julia Potts, theatre director, Executive Director of the Almeida Theatre
- Susanna White, film director

=== Business ===
- Jo Fairley, co-founder of Green and Black's

=== Non-profit charity ===
- Mary Baker, MBE, MSc Hons, former CEO of Parkinson's Disease Society and former President of the European Federation of Neurological Associations (BHS 1943–53)

=== Politics ===
- Margaret Hodge, MBE, MP, Chair of the Public Accounts Committee 2010–15
