= Sebastian Barker =

British poet (1945–2014)

Sebastian Barker

Sebastian Smart Barker (16 April 1945 – 31 January 2014) was a British poet notable for a visionary manner, that has been compared to William Blake in its use of the long ecstatic line and its "ability to write lyric poetry which used simple words to encapsulate profound meanings". His The Dream of Intelligence (1992) was named as a Book of the Year in both The Independent and The Spectator, and The Erotics of God (2005) was The Tablet′s Book of the Year in 2005.

== Early life and education ==
The son of poets George Barker and Elizabeth Smart, Sebastian Barker was educated at The King's School, Canterbury, Corpus Christi College, Oxford (MA), and at the University of East Anglia (MA).

== Career ==
He was on the executive committee of P.E.N. and was the Chairman of the Poetry Society from 1988 to 1992. In 1997 he was elected a Fellow of the Royal Society of Literature. In 2002 he took over editorship of the London Magazine, from which he resigned in 2008 after the Arts Council England had cut the magazine's funding. He was director of several literary festivals, including the Royal Berkshire Poetry Festival, and held writer-in-residence positions in Berkshire and Lincolnshire; Barker was also the recipient of awards from the Arts Council, the Society of Authors and the Royal Literary Fund. He worked for the Nietzsche Society of Great Britain, and the English College Foundation in Prague. His career included stints as a furniture restorer, carpenter, fireman and cataloguer at Sotheby's, and is summed up by his autobiographical poem "Curriculum Vitae".

His earlier collections, which include On the Rocks (Martin, Brian & O'Keeffe 1977), and A Nuclear Epiphany (Friday Night Fish Publications, 1984) were brought together in a volume of selected poems, Guarding the Border, published by Enitharmon Press in 1992. More recent collections include The Dream of Intelligence (Littlewood Arc, 1992, a long poem based on Nietzsche’s life and works), The Hand in the Well (Enitharmon, 1996), Damnatio Memoriae: Erased from Memory (Enitharmon, 2004), The Erotics of God (Smokestack Books, 2005) and A Monastery of Light (The Bow-Wow Shop, 2012). In August 2010, Barker contributed to an eBook collection of political poems entitled Emergency Verse – Poetry in Defence of the Welfare State edited by Alan Morrison.

At Oxford, he knew the Scottish writer Eddie Linden, who went on to become editor of the poetry magazine Aquarius, and was encouraged by Barker's mother Elizabeth. Barker later wrote a biography, Who is Eddie Linden. The book inspired a stage play, which was produced at The Old Red Lion in Islington, North London, in 1995.

Barker was baptised into the Roman Catholic faith at the age of 52. He defended a vatic or mystical view of poetic creation, and in a poem such as "Holy the Heart on which We Hang Our Hope" he explored "the way a mortal may interact with the divine, in which the obsessive attention demanded by the subject is mirrored in the use of a form developed from the repetitions of a villanelle."

In 1983, inspired by modern Greek poets such as Odysseas Elytis, Barker bought a ruin in a village called Sitochori ("Wheat Village"), Messenia, in the mountains of the south-west Peloponnese. Little by little, he rebuilt it in traditional style with the help of local people. The place became his home-from-home for almost 30 years. There he composed his late visionary sequence A Monastery of Light, described by William Oxley as "a pleasurable antidote to a reductive secular world".

== Personal life and death ==
Barker was married three times. His first marriage was in 1968, to Julie Ellis, and the couple had two daughters: Chloë, a website designer, and Miranda. The marriage ended in 1980, and in 1986, he wed psychotherapist Sally Rouse. Barker and Rouse had a son, Daniel, and a daughter, Xanthi. Daniel is an actor, comic writer, and voice artist, who has appeared in the 2020 revival of Spitting Image. In 2021, Xanthi's memoir of her relationship with her father, Will This House Last Forever?, was published. Barker and Rouse's marriage was dissolved in 1992. In 1998, he married the poet Hilary Davies, who he had met on the council of the Poetry Society. Partly owing to his relationship with Davies, Barker was received into the Catholic Church in 1997.

Barker died of a cardiac arrest after suffering from lung cancer, on 31 January 2014, aged 68.
