= Geraldine Norman =

Mathematician and writer (born 1940)

Geraldine Norman OBE
- Born: Geraldine Lucia Keen; 13 May 1940 (age 86); Wales, UK
- Education: St. Anne's College, Oxford; University of California, Los Angeles
- Occupations: Statistician, writer
- Spouse(s): John Frank Norman (m. 1971), d. 1980

Geraldine Lucia Norman, OBE (born 13 May 1940) is a British art journalist who made a special name for identifying fakes, moving on to work for the great Russian museum, the Hermitage in St. Petersburg.

== Life and work ==
Born Geraldine Lucia Keen to Harold Hugh Keen and Catherine Eleanor Lyle Cummins, she was educated in St. Anne's College, Oxford. She graduated in 1961 with a Masters of Arts in Mathematics, which she followed up by attending the University of California, Los Angeles, from 1961 to 1962 while working as a teaching assistant.

== Career ==
Norman got a job as a statistician for The Times newspaper in 1962 and began to write for the paper on statistics and computers. In 1965, she left to work for the FAO in Rome but was called back in 1967 to launch The Times-Sotheby index of art prices, which ran from 1967 to 1971. In 1969, she become the Sale Room Correspondent of The Times. Norman gained a name during that time as Christie's disliked her. She asked awkward questions about secret practices within the industry. After she published an article suggesting it should be revealed when auction lots were unsold, Peter Wilson, chairman of Sotheby's, was offended and discontinued the index. She continued to report on sales but also made a speciality of investigating fakes. She uncovered 13 drawings purporting to be by the 19th-century artist Samuel Palmer and went on to identify the forger as Tom Keating. She and her husband wrote a book with him about his life and the many artists he had forged. She also wrote about the faker Eric Hebborn, fakes at the Getty Museum in California, and investigated the authenticity of Van Gogh's Sunflowers sold at Christie's for a record price.

In 1987, she left The Times, as she had objected to the Murdoch takeover. Norman joined The Independent newspaper as Art Market Correspondent, eventually leaving in 1995 to focus on writing a book called The Hermitage: The Biography of a Great Museum (published in 1997 and reissued in 2017). She then set up a branch of the Hermitage Museum in Somerset House which ran from 2000 to 2007 and went on to launch the Friends of the Hermitage in 2003 and the Hermitage Magazine in 2004.

She was appointed OBE in 2011 for her service to UK/ Russian relations in fine art.

== Family ==
She married playwright and novelist John Frank Norman on 16 July 1971. They co-wrote The Fake's Progress: The Keating Story with Tom Keating in 1977. Frank died in 1980.

== Bibliography ==
- The Sale of Works of Art (as Geraldine Keen, 1971)
- Nineteenth Century Painters and Painting, A Dictionary (1977)
- The Fake's Progress (with Tom Keating & Frank Norman, 1977)
- The Tom Keating Catalogue (with Tom Keating, 1977)
- Mrs. Harper's Niece (as Florence Place, 1982)
- Biedermeier Painting (1987)
- Top Collectors of the World (with Natsuo Miyashita, 1993)
- The Hermitage: The Biography of a Great Museum (1997)
- Bob Hecht by Bob Hecht (ed. 2014)
- Dynastic Rule: Mikhail Piotrovsky and the Hermitage (2016)
- Culture as Scandal: The Hermitage Story (with Mikhail Piotrovsky) (2022)
