= Frank Norman =

British novelist and playwright (1930–1980)

- Born: 9 June 1930; Bristol, England
- Died: 23 December 1980 (aged 50)
- Occupations: Novelist and playwright
- Notable work: Bang to Rights (1958); Fings Ain't Wot They Used T'Be (1960)
- Spouse: Geraldine Lucia Keen

Frank Norman (9 June 1930 – 23 December 1980) was a British novelist and playwright. He is remembered chiefly for his first memoir, Bang to Rights (1958), and his musical play Fings Ain't Wot They Used T'Be (1960).

== Early life ==
John Norman was born on 9 June 1930 in Bristol, England, the illegitimate son of Frank Charles Booth and Beatrice Smith (née Norman), and ultimately was abandoned by both his natural parents. Although he lived most of his life in London and his writing style was distinctly Cockney, his place of birth was given as 151 Whiteladies Road, Clifton, Bristol. Not born within the sound of Bow Bells, London he was thus not regarded as a "true Cockney sparrow".

When John was abandoned by his mother some years later he was placed with the Church of England's Adoption Society, and after a few unsuccessful adoptions was placed with a wealthy woman whose servants looked after "Master John". It has been speculated that his name was changed around this period of living with the aforementioned wealthy woman, who he addressed as "Lady W". When this adoption did not work out, Frank was committed to a succession of children's homes in and around London, recounted in his childhood autobiography Banana Boy (1969). He was placed in the care of Dr Barnardo's on 24 March 1937, staying at Stepney HQ for a short time before being moved on 3 April 1937 to Cardington Abbey's Howard House at 17 Cardington Road, Bedford, recorded as a home for children with learning disabilities. One of his teachers there wrote, "This lad will never amount to much."

Frank started to settle down at Howard House, but on 21 August 1941 he was sent to Kingston-upon-Thames, which by all accounts was not a happy time for him. On 8 July 1944 he and several other boys were sent to Goldings, which turned out to be a most fearsome establishment as he recounted in his childhood autobiography Banana Boy (1969). While at Goldings he tried a few trades but could not master any, most likely due to his limited reading and writing skills. He ended up in the kitchen and then requested a transfer to the gardening department, eventually leaving Goldings on 17 October 1946, aged 16.

Frank's time at Goldings stood him in good stead during the times he would later spend "on holiday" in prison. For since leaving Dr. Barnardo's in 1937 Frank had been involved in petty crimes for which he was imprisoned, finally leading to a three-year stretch at Camp Hill Prison on the Isle of Wight.

== Early writing career ==
After prison, Norman started writing what was to become his best known book, his prison memoir Bang to Rights (1958). His various accounts of how he came to write it are at variance with one another, but within a year of his release Encounter magazine had published a 10,000-word extract. Championed at first by the editor of Encounter, Stephen Spender, and subsequently by Raymond Chandler - who wrote the foreword to Bang to Rights - Norman's literary success was assured.

After the success of Bang to Rights Norman wrote a draft of what was to become the musical Fings Ain't Wot They Used T'Be (1959), which found its way to Joan Littlewood. She produced it for the Theatre Workshop at the Theatre Royal, Stratford, with Lionel Bart writing the music for the songs. The play transferred to the West End, and Norman won the 1960 Evening Standard Drama Award for Best Musical. This early success was based in part on the frankness of his memoirs and on the style of his writing, which contained both renditions of Cockney speakers and his own poor spelling. In an obituary of Norman, Jeffrey Bernard wrote that he was "a 'natural' writer of considerable wit, powers of sardonic observation, and with a razor sharp ear for dialogue, particularly as spoken in the underworld."

Around the same period Norman was writing Stand On Me (1960), an autobiographical memoir of his life in Soho in the 1950s before imprisonment. His next book The Guntz (1962) was a follow-up to Bang to Rights, and related stories from his life as a successful writer. Soho Night And Day (1966) was a collaboration with Jeffrey Bernard whose photographs accompanied Norman's text. Two further novels following in quick succession: The Monkey Pulled His Hair (1967) and Barney Snip - Artist (1968).

== Later work ==
Norman's novels of the 1970s lacked some of the power of his earlier work. Dodgem Greaser (1971) contained the fictionalised memoirs of a fairground boy, based on Norman's own boyhood fairground experiences; One Of Our Own (1973) is a rambling novel of East End life; Much Ado About Nuffink (1974) is a semi-autobiographical novel about a working-class playwright whose play Who Do They Fink They're 'Aving A Go At, Then becomes a critical success; and Down and Out In High Society (1975) is a novel about Soho.

Three late novels – Too Many Crooks Spoil the Caper (1979), The Dead Butler Caper (1980) and The Baskerville Caper (1981) – found Norman back in strong form in a series featuring Ed Nelson, an under-employed Soho private detective with a penchant for Hankey Bannister Scotch whisky.

Norman's non-fiction writing included Norman's London (1969), which contained reprints of a selection of his early journalism, while Lock'em Up and Count'em (1970) provided an appraisal of and a plan of reform for the British prison system. The Penguin collection The Lives of Frank Norman (1972) contained extracts from four of his previously published autobiographical books, and a further memoir Why Fings Went West (1975) dealt specifically with theatre life in the late 1950s and early 1960s. His last published work of non-fiction was The Fake's Progress (1977), written in collaboration with its subject the art forger Tom Keating and Frank's wife Geraldine Norman, whom he married in 1971.

In 1960, Frank Norman appeared as a contestant on the TV game show To Tell the Truth, pretending to be British long-distance runner Frederick Norris. The host, Bud Collyer, acknowledged Norman's writing career by letting the audience know his prize-winning play Fings Ain't Wot They Used T'Be had been playing in London's West End for 14 months.

== Death ==
Frank Norman died of Hodgkin's lymphoma on 23 December 1980, aged 50.

== General works ==
- Bang To Rights (1958)
- Stand On Me (1960)
- The Guntz (1962)
- Soho Night And Day (1966)
- The Monkey Pulled His Hair (1967)
- Barney Snip – Artist (1968)
- Banana Boy (1969)
- Norman's London (1969)
- Lock'em Up And Count'em (1970)
- Dodgem Greaser (1971)
- The Lives Of Frank Norman (1972)
- One Of Our Own (1973)
- Much Ado About Nuffink (1974)
- Why Fings Went West (1975)
- Down And Out In High Society (1975)
- The Fake's Progress (1977) (with Tom Keating and Geraldine Norman)
- Too Many Crooks Spoil The Caper (1979)
- The Dead Butler Caper (1980)
- The Baskerville Caper (1981)

== Plays ==
- Fings Ain't Wot They Used T'Be (1959)
- A Kayf Up West (1964)
- Insideout (1969)
- Costa Packet

== Sources ==
- Jeffrey Bernard, "Mr Frank Norman", The Times, 28 December 1980.
