= Hilary Davies =

English poet, critic and translator (born 1954)

- Born: 1954 (age 71–72); London
- Education: Wadham College, Oxford
- Occupation: Poet
- Spouse: Sebastian Barker
- Awards: Eric Gregory Award

Hilary Davies (born 1954) is an English poet, critic and translator. She has also taught extensively.

== Biography ==
Davies was born in London to Anglo-Welsh parents, and was educated at Bromley High School and Wadham College, Oxford, where she was among the first intake of women students, graduating in French and German in 1974. She was married to the poet Sebastian Barker from 1998 until his death in 2014.

Davies won an Eric Gregory Award in 1983, and was chairman of the Poetry Society from 1992 to 1993. She taught for 30 years at St Paul's Girls' School, being head of modern languages for 19 years, until taking early retirement in 2011 to spend more time on her poetry. From 2012 to 2016, she held a Royal Literary Fund Fellowship at King's College London. She is a member of Poetry Salzburg Review's editorial board.

== Reception ==
The Times Literary Supplement, in a review of Davies' poem "The Ophthalmologist", wrote, "we might read this whole piece as an extended metaphor for the agony and ecstasy intrinsic to every creative act." A Contemporary Poetry Review review of New British Poetry discussing poet omissions from the collection stated, "I, for one, particularly regret the neglect of the underrated Hilary Davies, whose first book, The Shanghai Owner of the Bonsai Shop ... contains some of the most luminous and quietly compelling poems you'll come across on either side of the Atlantic." In a Valley of This Restless Mind has been called "a collection of high seriousness" and compared to the poetry of Elizabeth Jennings.

== Works ==
- "The Ophthalmologist" (1987)
- The Shanghai Owner of the Bonsai Shop (1991, Enitharmon; ISBN 9781870612562)
- In a Valley of This Restless Mind (1997, Enitharmon; ISBN 9781870612975)
- Imperium (2005, Enitharmon; ISBN 9781900564199)
- Exile and the Kingdom (2016, Enitharmon; ISBN 9781910392171)
- Compass Light (2025, Renard Press; ISBN 9781804471593)
