= The Penguin Book of Homosexual Verse =

1983 book by Stephen Coote

- Author: Stephen Coote
- Publisher: Penguin Books
- Publication date: 1983
- Publication place: United Kingdom

The Penguin Book of Homosexual Verse (1983) is an anthology of poetry dealing with "a history of the different ways in which homosexual people have been seen or have seen themselves", from classical antiquity to the contemporary period. It was compiled by Stephen Coote and published by Penguin Books.

Although praising its subject matter, Paul Knobel of The Age criticised the broad scope of the anthology, as well as its Eurocentric focus, as the anthology focuses on literature in English and contains poems in most major European languages (with the exception of Polish), and two Arabic poems; no East Asian, African or Oceanian content was included. Some significant contemporary American gay male poets were also not included in the book.

== See also ==
- Lieblingminne und Freundesliebe in der Weltliteratur
