= Notting Hill Gate =

Street in London

Coordinates: 51.509°N 0.197°W

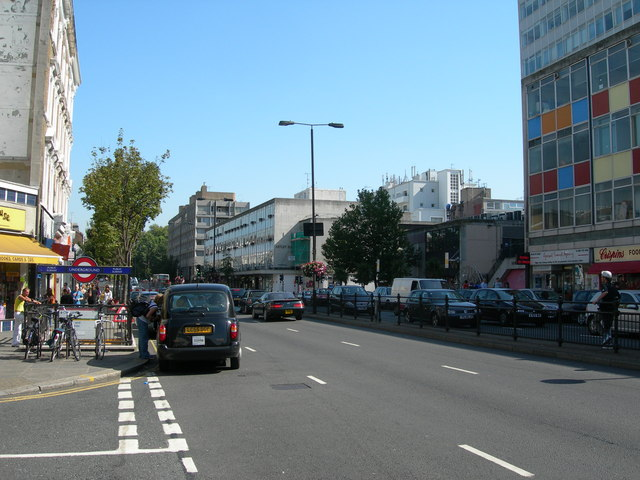
A402, Notting Hill Gate, 2006

Notting Hill Gate is one of the main thoroughfares in the Royal Borough of Kensington and Chelsea. Historically the street was a location for toll gates, from which it derives its modern name.

== Location ==
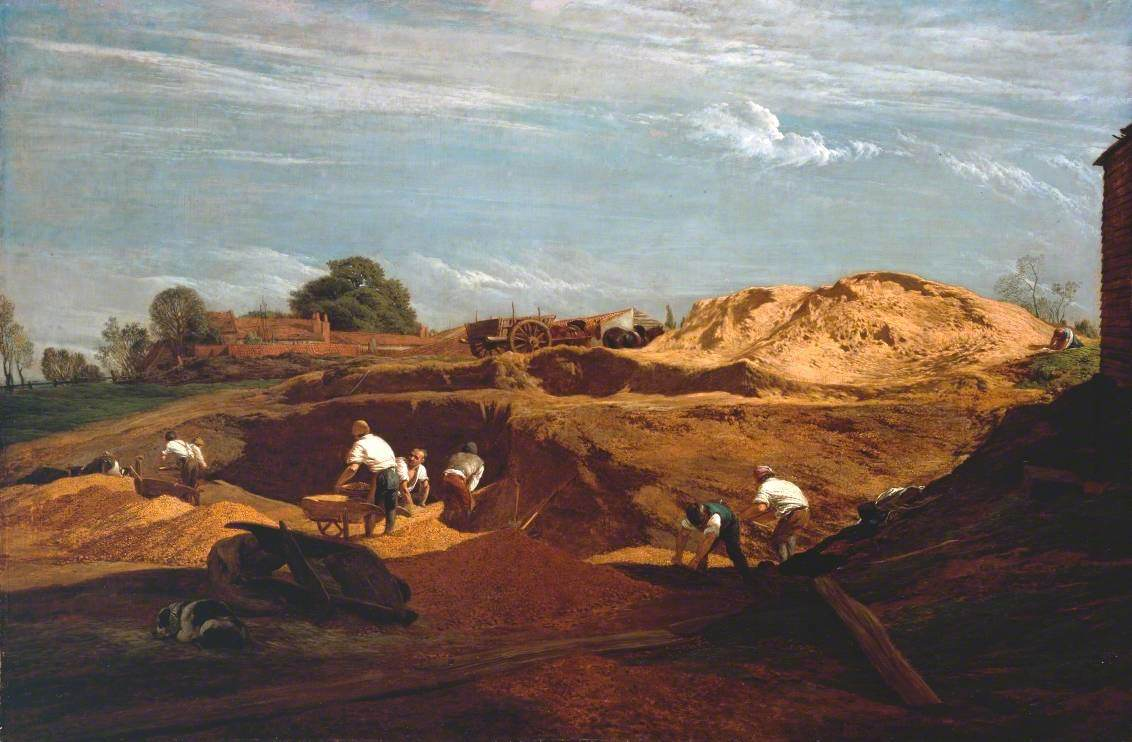
Kensington Gravel Pits by John Linnell, 1812. Once on the outskirts of London, the area was known as Kensington Gravel Pits.

At Ossington Street/Kensington Palace Gardens, the Bayswater Road becomes Notting Hill Gate, continuing westward until it becomes Holland Park Avenue, just before it reaches Ladbroke Grove.

Notting Hill Gate is distinct from Notting Hill, although the two are often confused, with "Notting Hill" being used as an abbreviation of "Notting Hill Gate" and "Notting Hill Gate" suggesting to outsiders that it is the full description of Notting Hill. In fact, however, the street named Notting Hill Gate is well to the south of the hill (with its summit at the junction of Ladbroke Grove and Kensington Park Gardens) which gives its name to the area known (long before the establishment of the Notting Hill toll gate) as Notting Hill.

== Character ==
Notting Hill Gate is home to a variety of stores, restaurants, cafés and estate agents as well as more specialist stores which include rare records and antiques, as well as two historic cinemas, the Coronet (originally opened as a theatre in 1898) and the Gate, as well as also several bars and clubs.

== 1950s redevelopment ==
Much of the street was redeveloped in the 1950s with two large tower blocks being erected on the north and south sides of the street. At this time Notting Hill Gate tube station was also redeveloped linking two stations on the Circle and District and Central lines which had previously been accessed on either side of the street with an entirely underground station enabling interchange between the deep level Central Line and the sub-surface Circle and District Lines. The new tube station also acts as a pedestrian subway under the widened Notting Hill Gate, the subway leading to the ticket office, a toilet (now closed) and a newsagent (now closed).

Not all of Notting Hill Gate's original features were lost when it was redeveloped however, one good example of this being the Notting Hill Coronet. Previously a theatre, it was converted into a cinema in 1923, and was saved from demolition by local activists in 1972 and 1989. In 2004, its long-term future was secured by the Kensington Temple who acquired the site with the intention of continuing to provide independent cinema. The Coronet is one of two famous cinemas on Notting Hill Gate, the other being the Gate which opened in 1911 and still retains its Edwardian plasterwork, including a heavily coffered ceiling.

== Transport links ==
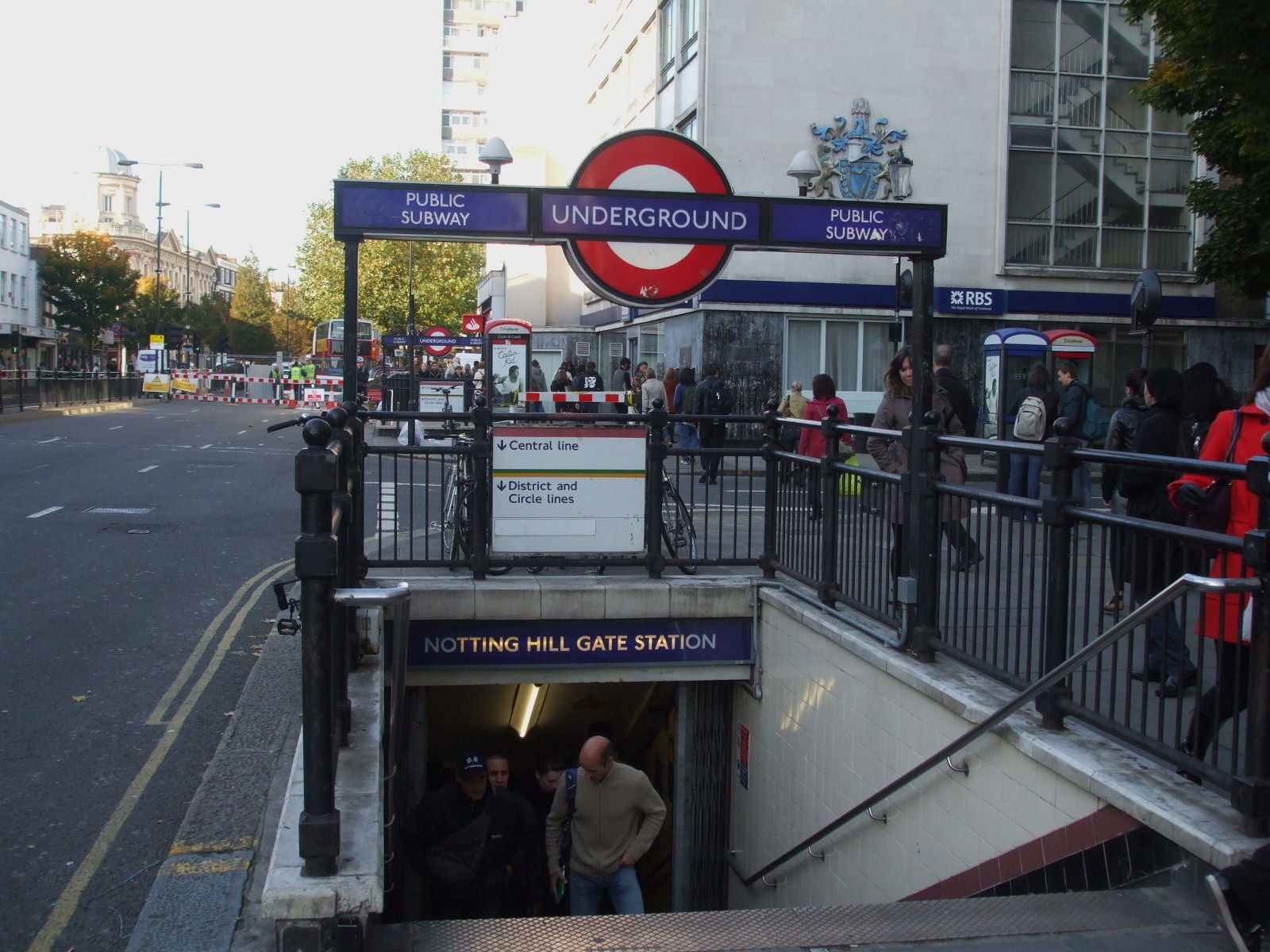
Notting Hill Gate tube station northeastern entrance

=== London Underground ===
Notting Hill Gate is the site of Notting Hill Gate tube station served by the Central, Circle & District lines.

=== London Buses ===
It is also on the route of the 27, 28, 31, 52, 70, 94, 148, 328, 452, N28, N31 and N207 buses. There are several bus stops along both sides of Notting Hill Gate.

=== Oxford Tube coach service ===
It is also on the route of the 24-hour Oxford Tube (coach) service.

== Environs ==
To the south of Notting Hill Gate lies Kensington Church Street, with its restaurants and antique shops, Hillgate Village (a name given to the area immediately south of Notting Hill Gate with its multi-coloured houses) and Campden Hill Road. North from the tube station lies Pembridge Road, which leads to Westbourne Grove. This area is often packed with tourists heading to the nearby Portobello Road market, or to spot locations from the film Notting Hill.

The Notting Hill Gate Improvement Group aims to improve the environment of Notting Hill Gate and neighbouring streets, working in partnership with the Council of the Royal Borough of Kensington & Chelsea and Land Securities and Delancey plc, which own many of the 1950s buildings. However, the London Evening Standard reported on 17 May 2010 that Land Securities and Delancey have put their Notting Hill Gate estate up for sale, with an asking price of £130 million. The 4.4-acre (1.8 ha) freehold estate includes about two-thirds of Notting Hill Gate and part of Kensington Church Street. Land Securities, which has owned it since the '50s, in partnership with Delancey Estates since 2004, decided to sell after plans to brighten up the area foundered in 2005 in the face of local and council opposition.

== In the media ==
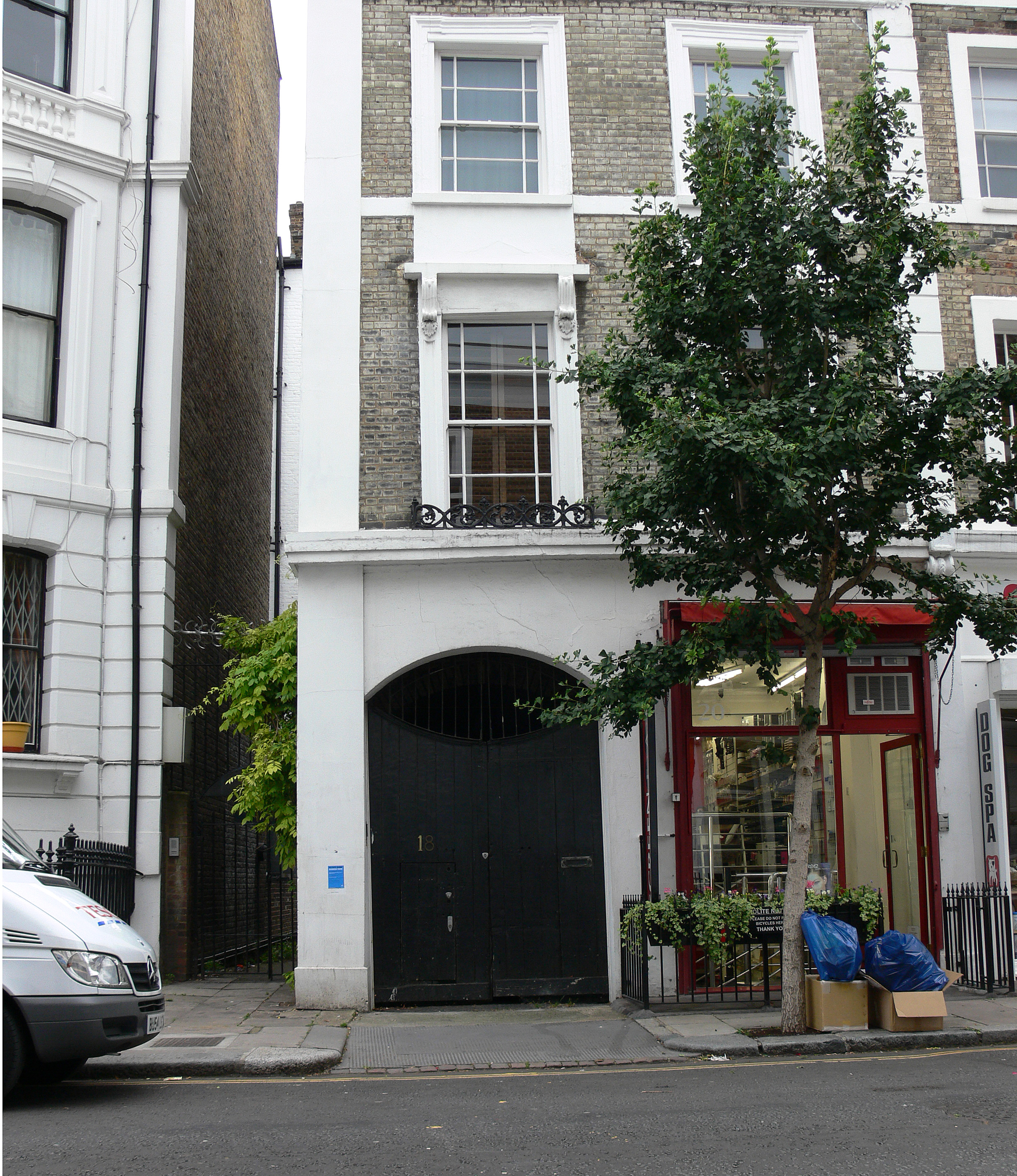
The Powis Terrace loft where the cast of The Real World: London resided.

- The Gate Bar, which is located in the basement of the Gate Cinema, was used as a location in the television comedy Absolutely Fabulous (Series 4 Episode 1: "Parralox"; aired 31 August 2001).
- The loft at 18 Powis Terrace was used as the cast residence for the American reality TV show, The Real World: London, which aired in 1995. The ground floor of the building is leased to ScreenFace, a professional make-up supply company.
- Van Morrison mentions Notting Hill Gate in his songs "Friday’s Child" and "He Ain't Give You None".
- In episode 1 of Come Back Mrs. Noah, a futuristic lift gives passengers directions in a Caribbean accent -- Ian Lavender explains the device was "made in Notting Hill Gate."
- In the Are You Being Served episode, "Fire Practice" (Series 4 Episode 4; aired 29 April 1976), Mr. Humphries (John Inman) mentions he lives "just near Notting Hill Gate."
- Jonathan Raban's radio play "At the Gate" is set in Notting Hill Gate.
- Filmmaker Louis Theroux raps about driving his Fiat through Notting Hill Gate in his viral rap "Jiggle Jiggle."
