= Kensington Gravel Pits =

Village in London, England

Coordinates: 51.509°N 0.197°W

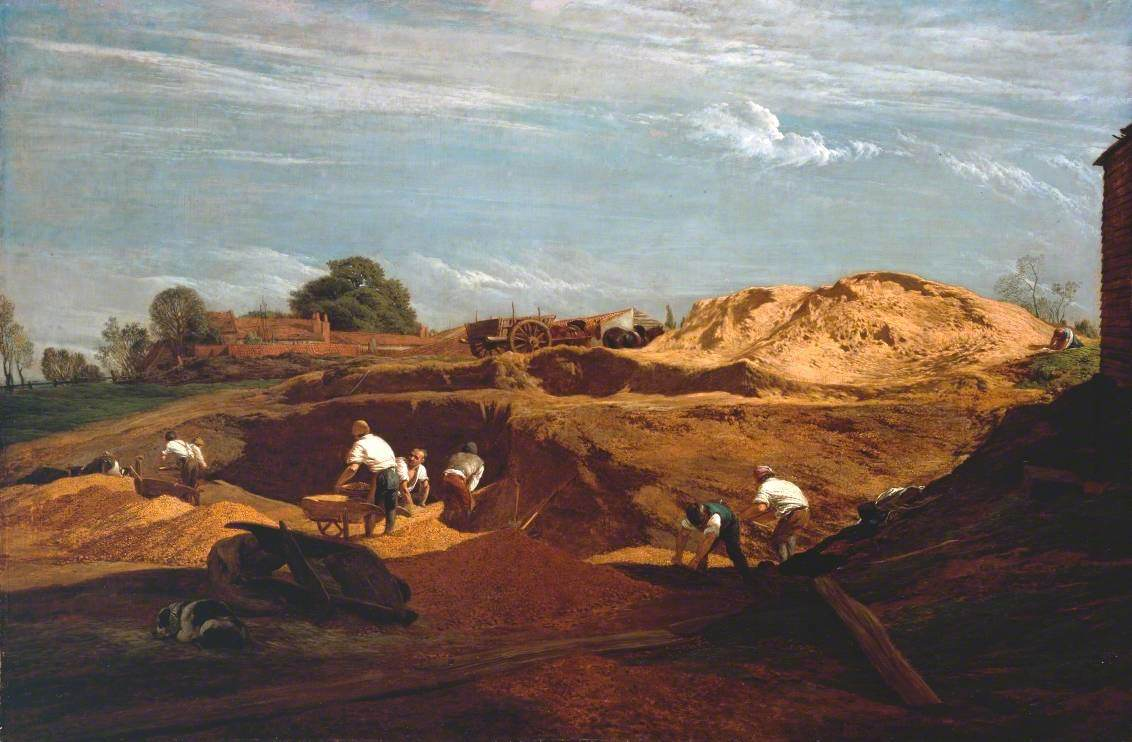
Kensington Gravel Pits by John Linnell, 1812

Kensington Gravel Pits was an old village located at the junction of what are now known as Bayswater Road and Kensington Church Street. This area is now known as Notting Hill Gate. The village was named after gravel quarries located between the village and the town of Kensington. It was a popular location for artists during the early 19th century, with John Linnell, Thomas Webster and others living in the area.

Another painter, Augustus Wall Callcott, was born there at No.1 (now 128 Church Street). The Italian composer Muzio Clementi also lived there in the 1820s, and later the English composer William Horsley, who married Callcott's eldest daughter, Elizabeth Hutchins Callcott. From the early 1830s Horsley often invited his friend Felix Mendelssohn to stay there during his visits to England.

Linnell's 1812 landscape painting Kensington Gravel Pits depicts the gravel pits during the Regency era.
