= Gravel pit =

Open-pit mine for the extraction of gravel

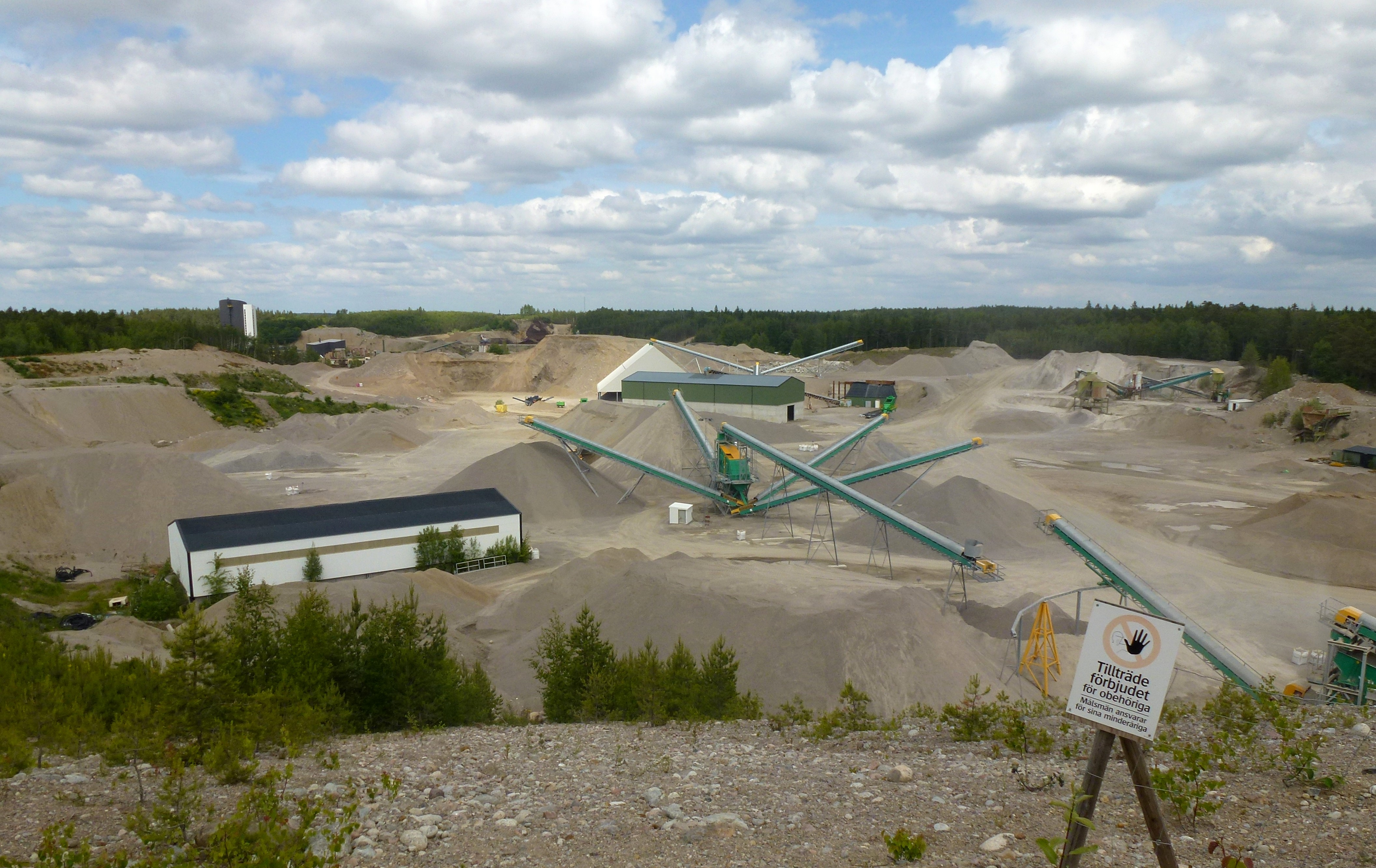
Gravel pit in Tullingeåsen, which forms part of Uppsalaåsen.

A gravel pit is an open-pit mine for the extraction of gravel.

Gravel pits often lie in river valleys where the water table is high, so they may naturally fill with water to form ponds or lakes. Gravel pit lakes are typically nutrient rich and can support thriving ecosystems, but can also present environmental issues such as the release of toxic metals into watersheds from the exposed rock. Old, abandoned gravel pits are normally used either as nature reserves, or as amenity areas for water sports, landfills and walking. In Germany former gravel or sand pits that have filled up with water are known as Baggersee ("power dug lake") and popular for recreational use. In addition, many gravel pits in the United Kingdom have been stocked with freshwater fish such as the common carp to create coarse fishing locations. Gravel pit lakes have also been stocked with carp in Denmark, as well as rainbow trout.

== Products ==
Gravel pits are a main source of aggregates such as gravel and sand, which are extracted then processed extensively to be suitable for various uses. Aggregates are mined to make concrete, be crushed into construction aggregate, and for other industrial mineral uses. Gravel pits are located where there are rich sources of materials suitable to be crushed into aggregate, often at sites of fluvial, glacial, or floodplain geological deposits. Sedimentary and igneous rocks typically produce good quality aggregates of various sizes, but metamorphic rocks are rarely mined at gravel pits as they tend to have weaker geological structures. The strength of the aggregates mined at gravel pits is important to ensure that the products created using them have good structural integrity.

=== Production process ===
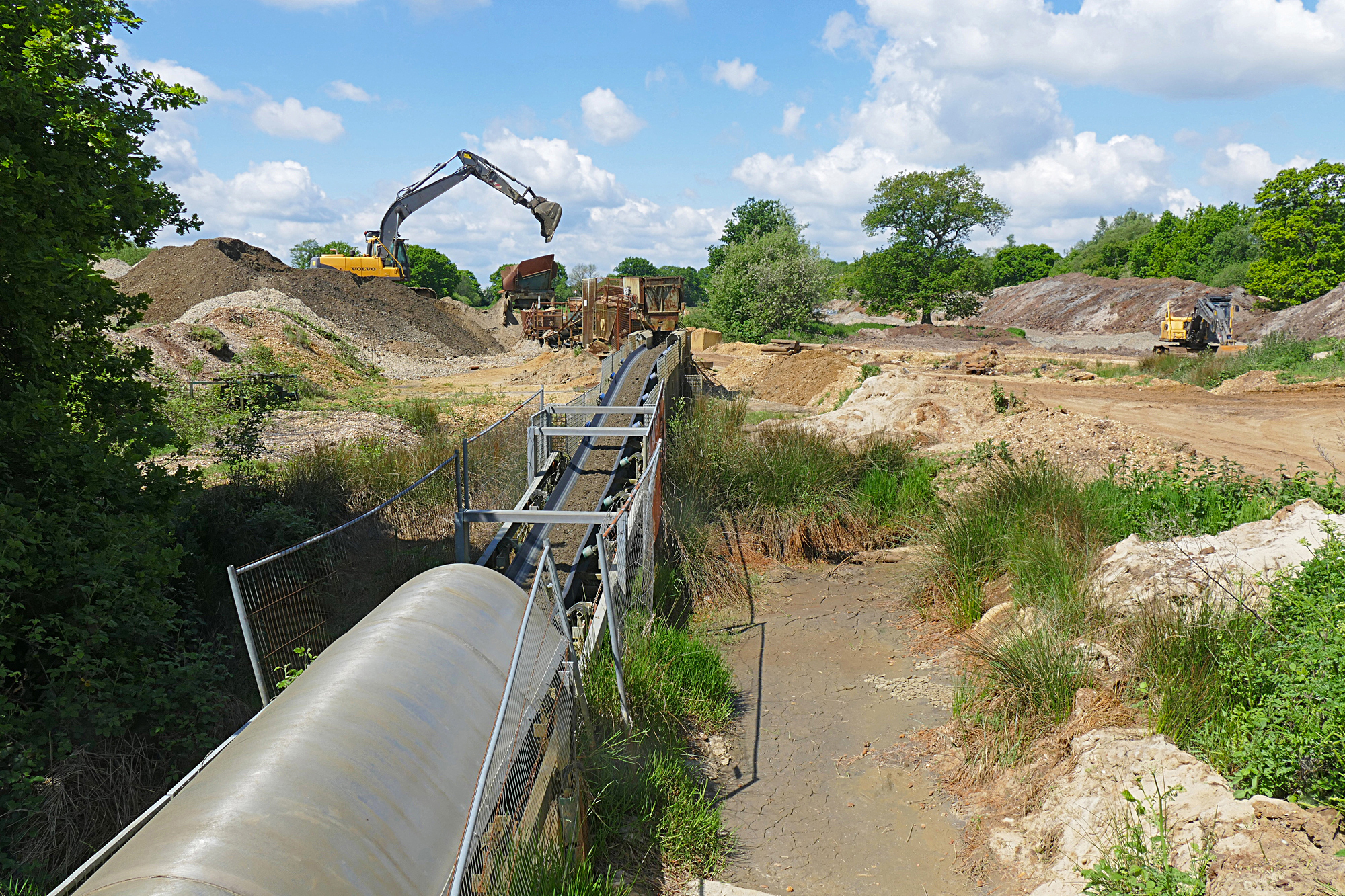
Conveyor operating in a gravel pit.

Once a deposit of aggregate material is located (often in river valleys where rock has been carried downstream and settled over time) the surface vegetation and topsoil is cleared to reveal the rock. Once a pit is dug into the aggregate, it can be lifted out by bulldozers that load it onto a conveyor or dredged out if the pit fills with water. It is then separated by particle size, crushed, and washed in preparation for use. Washing removes unwanted small particulate matter such as clay, silt, and sand, and is also a safety measure for dust control.

=== Product uses ===
A major direct use of the aggregates produces at gravel pits is road construction. Road structure typically includes pavement and multiple sub-layers of aggregates of increasing sizes with depth beneath the pavement, up to several meters. All the layers of the road structure requires naturally occurring aggregates that are extracted from gravel pits or other surface material extraction sites. Beyond the initial construction of paved roads, gravel pits are important for the ongoing maintenance of unpaved roads because the surfaces of unpaved roads must be continually graded and re-surfaced with new loads of aggregate. In remote regions served by isolated unpaved roads, gravel pit operations are often located at strategic intervals every few hundred kilometers along the roadway in conjunction with road maintenance camps to provide the maintenance crews working out of these camps with the necessary materials. For example, along the Dempster Highway that stretches across the isolated northern region of Yukon Territory, Canada, there are several gravel pits in use for road maintenance and several more that have fallen into disuse. However, most are expected to be put back into operation in the near future as permafrost changes the road structure over time, which is a challenge affecting many isolated roads in the north, and one of the ways that gravel pits are particularly important to remote regions that face unique challenges.

== Issues surrounding gravel pits ==
=== Environmental impacts ===
Gravel pits disrupt the natural processes of the landscapes in which they are operating by displacing vegetation, soil, and rock. This in turn re-routes surface water flow changing runoff patterns, which can create further environmental problems for entire watersheds. Habitats are destroyed, displacing wildlife and removing plants, which changes the ecology of the region. Silica dust caused by aggregate extraction is stirred up and carried in the wind coating plant leaves and minimizing photosynthesis, which not only disrupts natural vegetative processes but also affects agriculture and can therefore disrupt rural economies. Environmental impact assessments must be conducted before such projects to mitigate negative affects, and rehabilitation efforts should be undertaken after projects to restore the natural ecosystem. Unfortunately, most old gravel pits have not been rehabilitated after aggregate extraction has ceased, and their potential to be restored to accommodate improved ecosystem function is wasted.

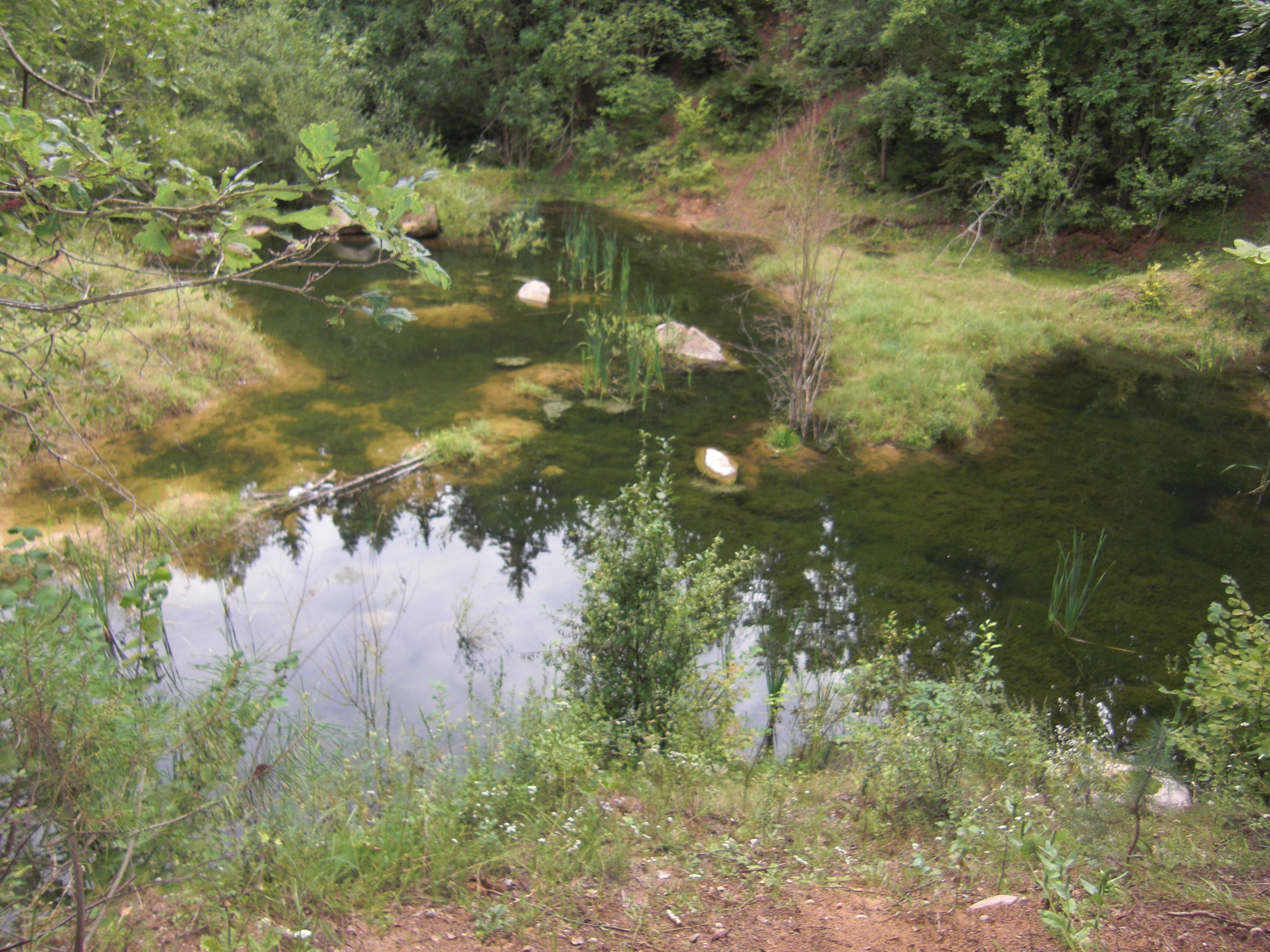
Abandoned gravel pit filled with water and vegetation regrowth.

=== Human health impacts ===
The negative impacts on human health from gravel pit operations are well documented. Both workers of gravel pits and residents close to gravel pits are at risk of pulmonary issues ranging from shortness of breath and airway restriction to chronic obstructive pulmonary disease and silicosis. The culprit of these issues is the fine silica dust created and stirred up by aggregate extraction processes and carried in the wind, which people breathe in and coats surfaces such as nearby homes and plants. There are also concerns that agricultural plants coated in dust from gravel pit operations pose a risk to human health through consumption if the plant contains the dust. There have been widespread movements by communities affected by gravel pit operations to have them moved away to less windy, residential, or agricultural areas, and for better safety precautions to be adopted for worker health.

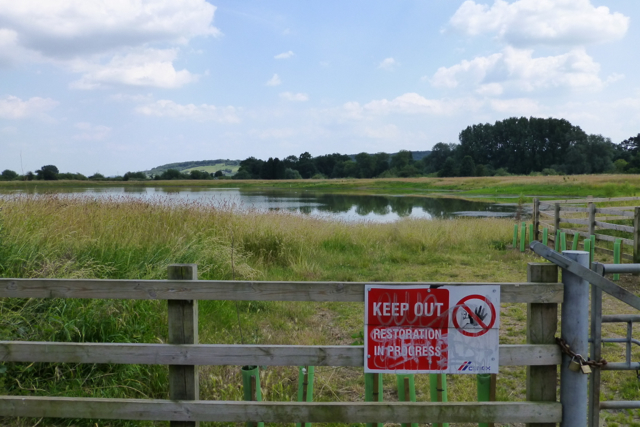
Gravel pit under restoration.

== Rehabilitation potential of abandoned gravel pits ==
Once a gravel pit site is no longer producing aggregate it will often fall into disuse and be left abandoned. Many become informal recreation sites or transition into wetlands, lakes, or ponds as they fill with water, but remediation can help this process and reduce safety hazards they impose in their industrial state. Remediation programs can be undertaken to build abandoned gravel pits into sites of thriving wildlife habitats, parks or farmland, and/or be flooded and stocked for recreational fishing and to create aquatic ecosystems.

== Gallery ==
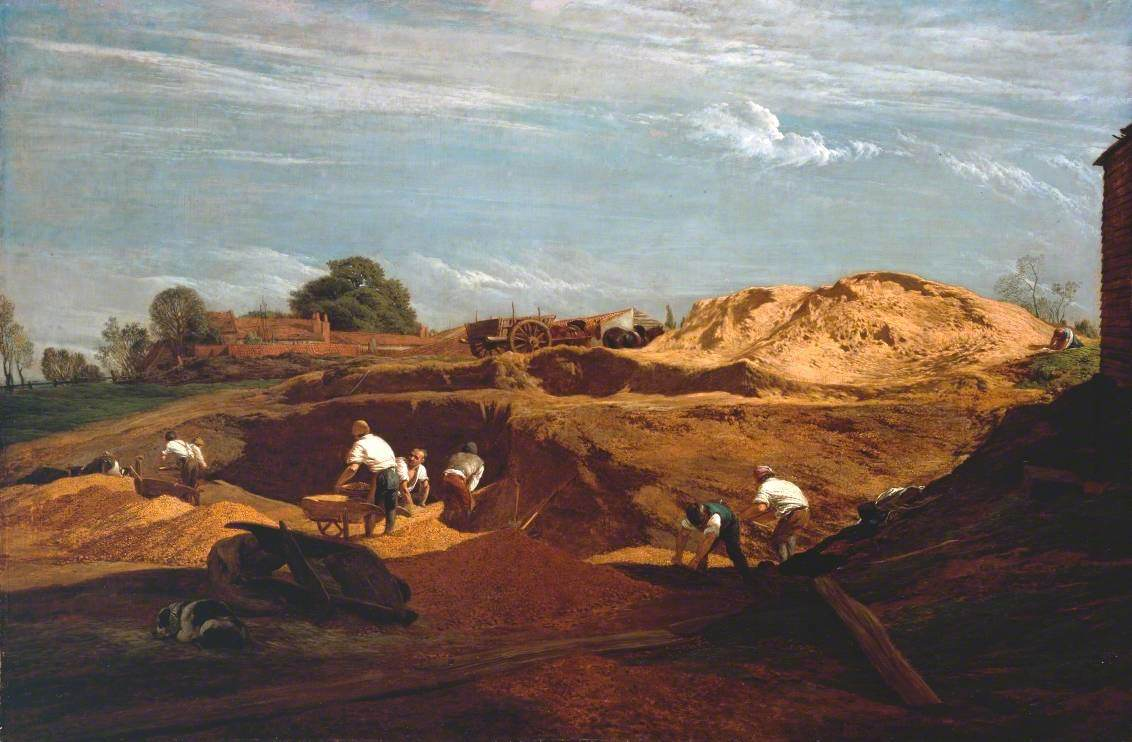
Kensington Gravel Pits, an 1812 painting by John Linnell

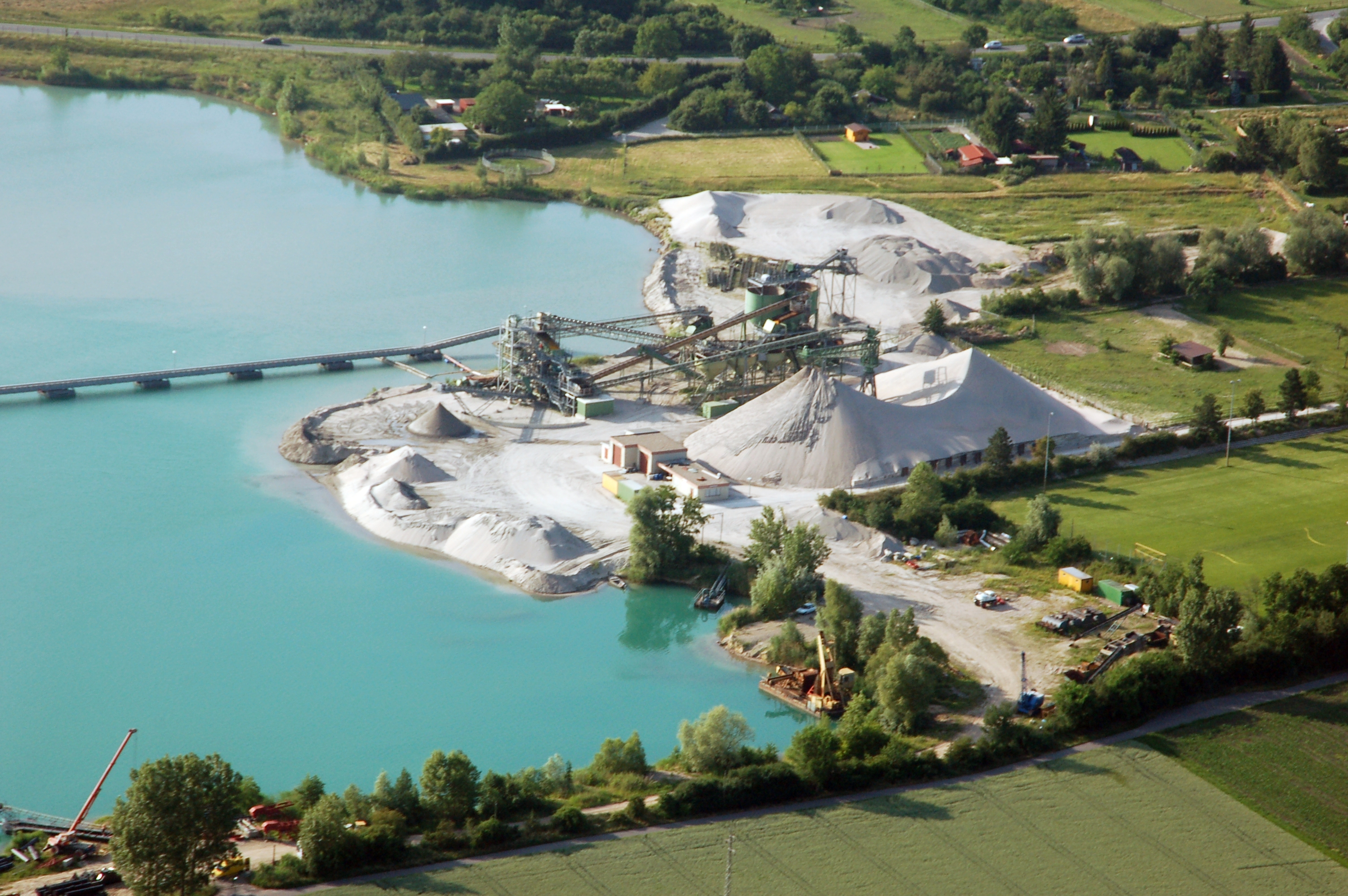
A gravel pit in Germany

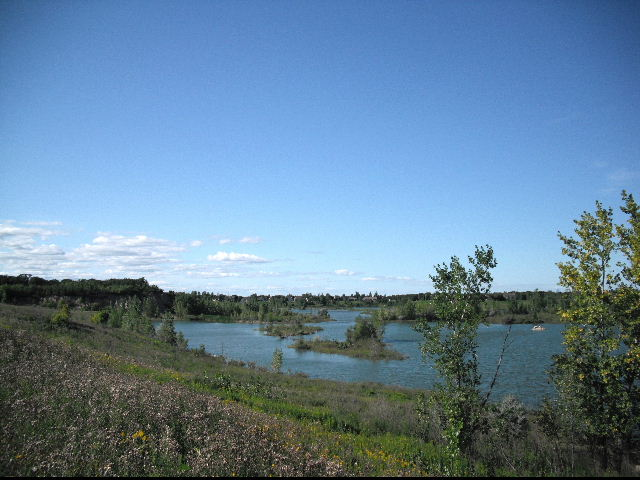
A naturalized gravel pit, now Silver Springs Park in East St. Paul, Manitoba.

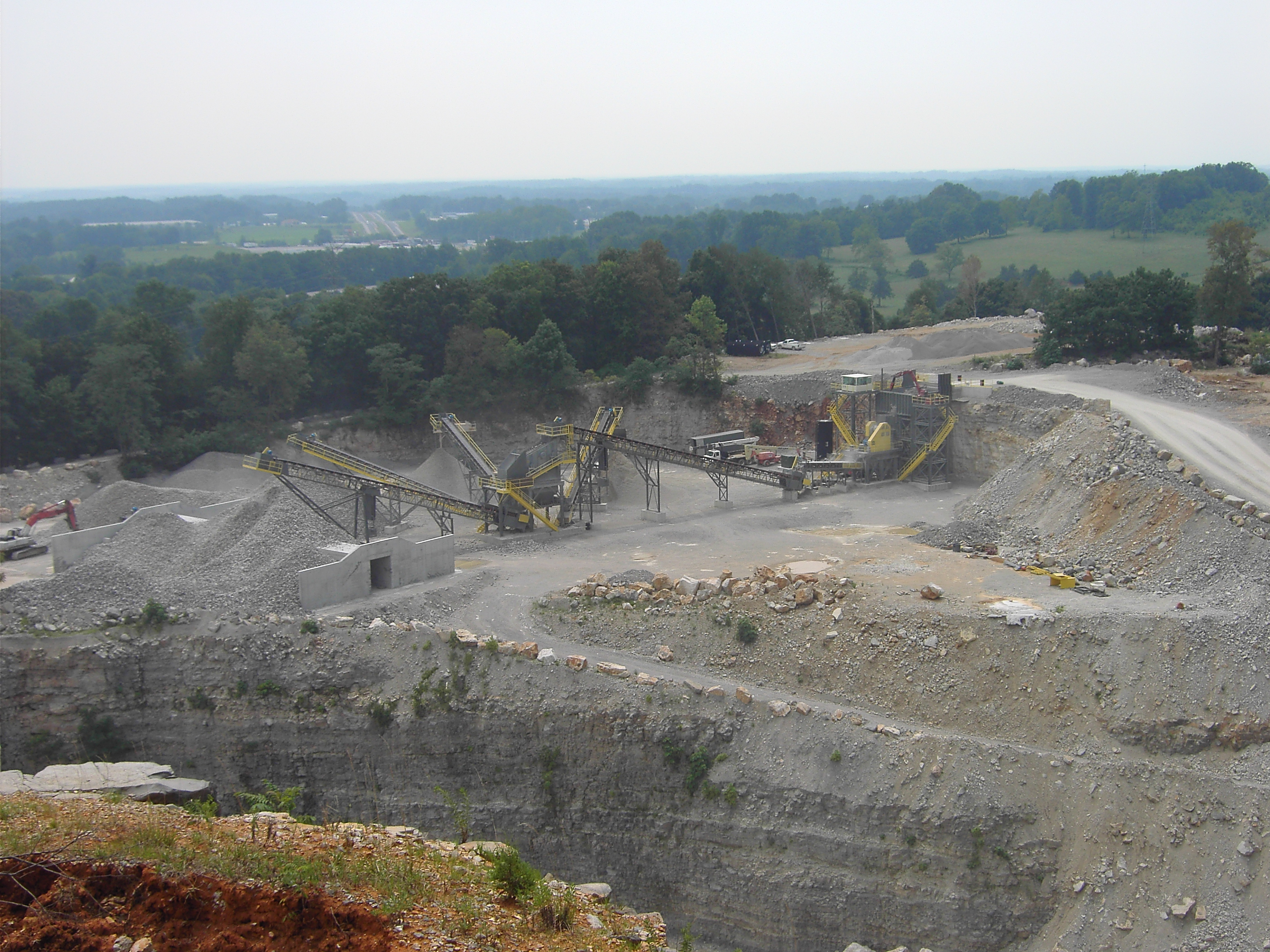
Tennessee quarry

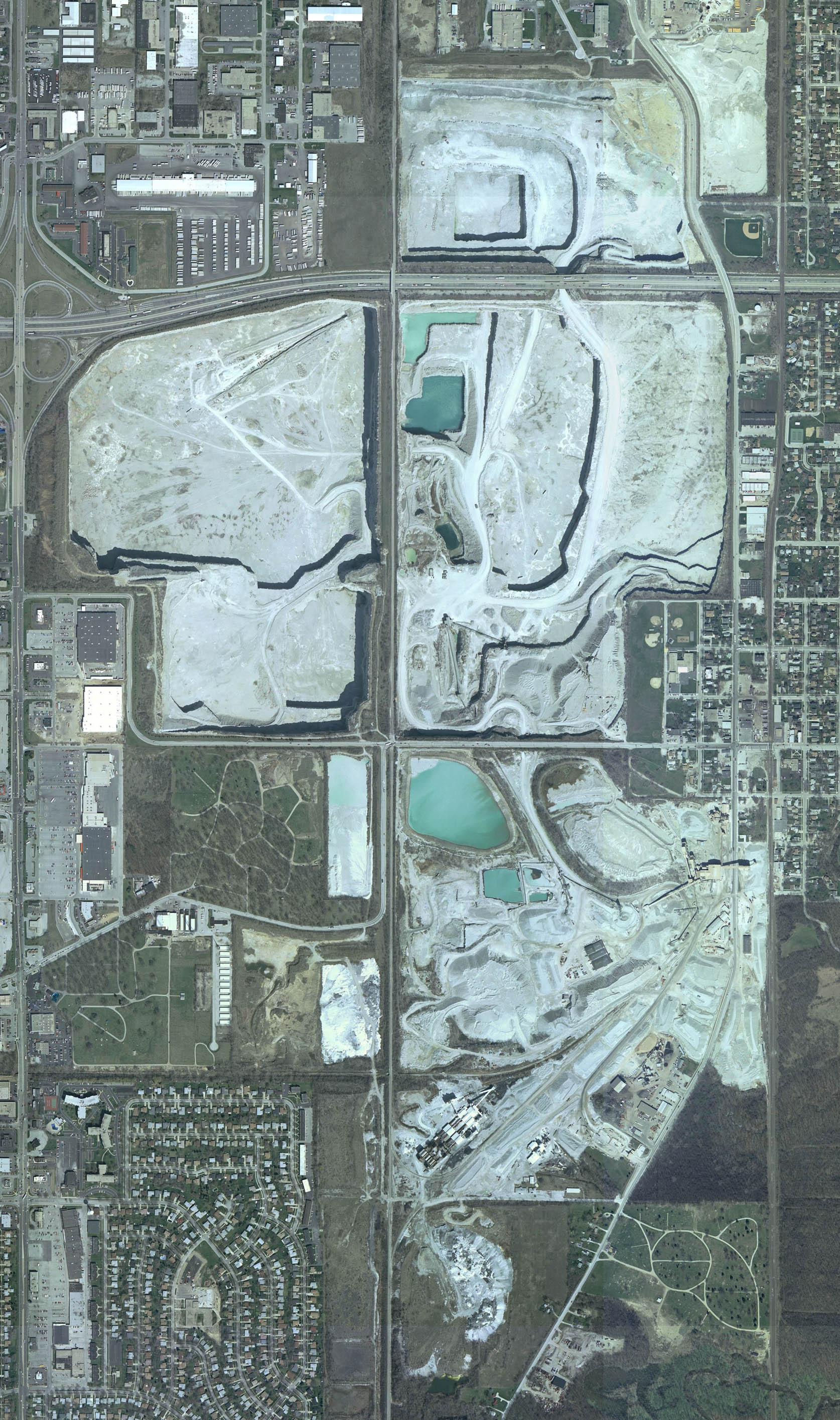
Overhead view of the Thornton Quarry.

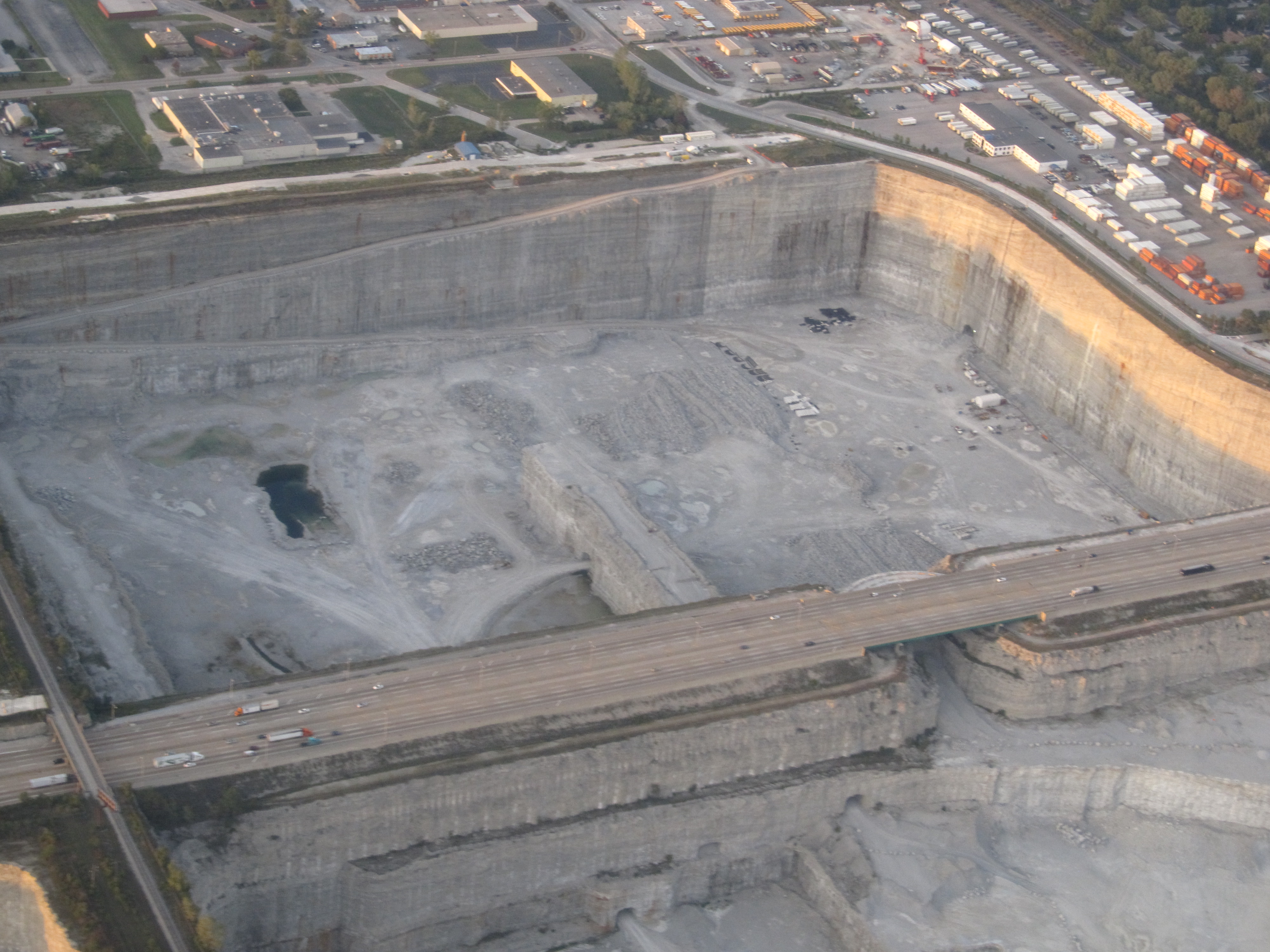
Thornton Quarry with Interstate 80/Interstate 294/Tri-State Tollway above.
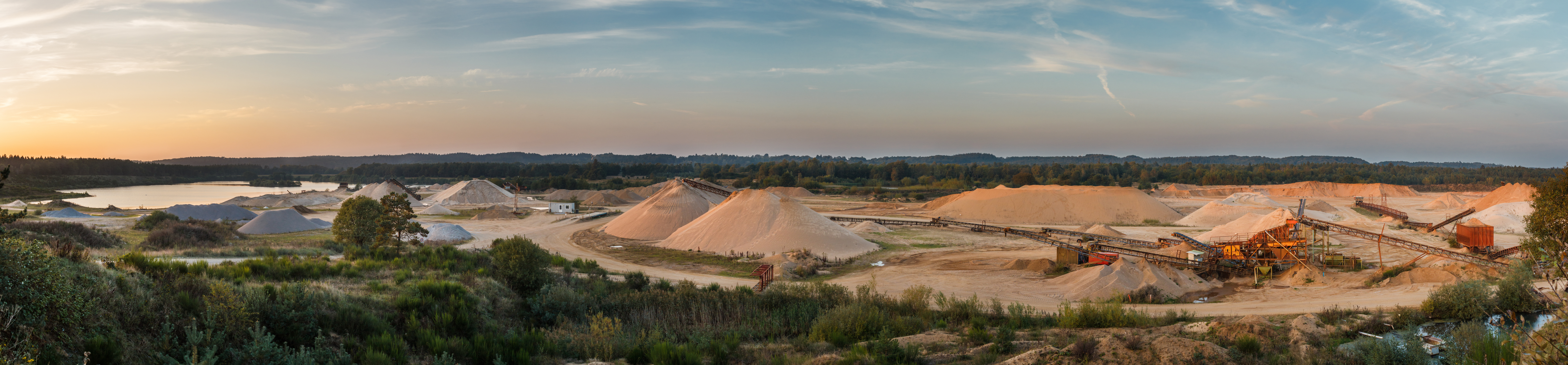
Panorama of a gravel pit near Ans, Denmark

== See also ==
- Borrow pit
- Clay pit
- Quarry
- Rock (geology)
- Granite
- Stone industry
- Mining engineering
