= Hannah Emma Palmer =

Via delle Scuole, Pompeii (1838), Chazen Museum of Art

Hannah Emma Palmer (née Linnell; 8 September 1818 – 27 October 1893) was an English painter. She was the daughter of the landscape painter John Linnell and married to the painter Samuel Palmer. After their marriage in 1837 she travelled with her husband to Italy, where she spent about two years making drawings of Renaissance frescoes in the Vatican and studies from nature around Rome, Naples and Pompeii. Five of her Italian landscapes were shown at the Royal Academy of Arts between 1840 and 1842. Her work is held by the Yale Center for British Art, the Chazen Museum of Art, Amgueddfa Cymru – Museum Wales and the Fitzwilliam Museum, as well as private collections.

== Early life and marriage ==
Hannah Emma Linnell was born on 8 September 1818 at Rathbone Place, London, the daughter of the painter John Linnell and his wife Mary Ann. The landscape painter Samuel Palmer courted her from the mid-1830s. In a letter to Linnell of 5 June 1836 he wrote of her "eager and increasing desire for intellectual attainments". They married on 30 September 1837 at Marylebone. The next month the couple left for Italy with the painter George Richmond and his wife Julia.

== Working in Italy ==
The Palmers travelled via Paris, where Hannah visited the Louvre and the Tuileries, and spent the following two years in Italy.

=== Copies in Rome ===
In letters from Rome in autumn 1837 she wrote of her ambition to make a coloured record of the Sistine Chapel, a project undertaken for her father. Access to the chapel was delayed, and in December 1837 she practised on other Vatican frescoes. By January 1838 she had finished a copy of Raphael's School of Athens and ten Sistine prints. The following month the Sistine work was nearly complete and a commission to copy Raphael's Loggia was under way, and in March she was producing thirteen images for a series after Raphael's Bible, working seven-hour days. A sketch of Titian's Sacred and Profane Love "drawn by Mrs. Palmer" appears in George Richmond's memoranda book of 1837–1839.

Both Palmers showed work at an exhibition in Rome in April 1838. In July 1838 Samuel Palmer reported to Linnell that she was "beginning her professional life."

=== Corpo di Cava and Pompeii ===
In summer 1838 she drew at Corpo di Cava near Naples and at Pompeii. Two works from this period are now in museums in the United States: Bridge at Corpo di Cava (1838), signed "H. Palmer", at the Yale Center for British Art, and Via delle Scuole, Pompeii (1838) at the Chazen Museum of Art. In an August 1838 letter to her father she proposed a series of etchings based on her drawings. In December Samuel Palmer wrote to Linnell that she now had "a livelihood in her hands".

=== Commissions and costs ===
In January 1839 she wrote of the obstacles facing women artists in Italy, noting that the scaffolding at the sites was inaccessible to women and that she could not work alone in Naples. In March another artist, Lees, valued her Loggia drawings at 17 shillings each, and Linnell wrote that a patron named Daniell had offered her £25 by name for a watercolour after Raphael's Disputa. Illness delayed the Loggia project in May, and in June she wrote of her anxiety about "future success in art." In September she was in Florence copying the Madonna del Sacco. A reckoning of accounts in November valued her Sistine work at £5 a day, half her husband's rate.

== Career in England ==
=== Royal Academy exhibits ===
By 1840 the Palmers had returned to England and were living in Marylebone. Over the course of three years she exhibited five works at the Royal Academy's Summer Exhibition, all Italian landscapes:

- 1840: Tivoli with the Cascatelli, drawn on the spot (no. 544) and Study from nature at Papigno near Terni (no. 545)
- 1841: The monastery of la Trinita at Corpo di Cava near Naples (no. 838)
- 1842: Rustic bridge at Corpo di Cava near Naples, drawn upon the spot (no. 655) and From the Locanda at Corpo di Cava near Naples, drawn upon the spot (no. 947)

Palmer encouraged her to continue her work and made alternative living arrangements for his father, so as not to place an additional burden on her time. However her participation in exhibitions stopped in 1842, the year her son Thomas More was born.

=== Sales and commissions ===
Her sales continued after she stopped showing at the academy. In May 1846 the dealer Charles Tooth sold her "little pictures" at £2 2s each, and she received a commission to copy a Titian. In September 1854 Samuel Palmer sought access for her to the British Museum to sketch Albrecht Dürer's prints.

Job Offering a Sacrifice on His Return to Prosperity, with John Linnell (1845), Fitzwilliam Museum

Her painting Job Offering a Sacrifice on His Return to Prosperity (1845) in the Fitzwilliam Museum, is credited to both Hannah Palmer and John Linnell. A label on the back, in Linnell's hand, describes it as a genuine work by his daughter and says he may have touched the figure of Job. Linnell, who had long been worried that Samuel was not selling his paintings, retouched Hannah's picture as well as Samuel's The Bay of Baiae to help them sell, a common practice in the first half of the nineteenth century, to which Samuel had no objection. Linnell sold both paintings to a Mr Taggart, receiving 15 guineas for each, and forwarded the full 30 guineas to Hannah.

== Family and later life ==
The Palmers had three children whose names are recorded. Thomas More Palmer was baptised at Christ Church, St Marylebone, in February 1842 and died on 11 July 1861. Mary Elizabeth, born in 1844, died in 1848. Their son Alfred Herbert Palmer survived his mother.

In the 1850s, she spent time staying with her parents at their home in Redhill, due to serious disagreements over the upbringing of Thomas More. In November 1865 she was seriously ill and spent a long period in Brighton, financed by her father.

Despite leaving her professional practice aside, her family continued to recognise her artistic taste and expertise. In May 1861 Samuel Palmer told Linnell he trusted her judgement on the conditions of a studio he intended to acquire. In October 1877 Samuel Palmer wrote to the critic Frederic George Stephens with his wife's response to the Athenaeum review of the Claude Lorrain paintings at Holkham Hall: "Claude is so beautiful that the very description of his pictures is music." Her son later stated in an exhibition catalogue "Her knowledge of and taste in Art was well thought of at Redstone Wood and Furze Hill House, where there were many examples of her strenuous Italian labours."

In 1891 Hannah was registered as a boarder at Tilford, Surrey, near the home of her son. She died on 27 October 1893, aged 75, at Middle Bourne, Farnham; the death certificate citing the cause as softening of the brain and exhaustion. She was buried at Reigate, and her estate of £1,172 12s 6d passed to her son Alfred.

== Legacy and collections ==
=== Works in Public Collections ===
Bridge at Corpo di Cava (1838), Yale Center for British Art

- Italian Landscape (1837), Amgueddfa Cymru – Museum Wales
- Bridge at Corpo di Cava (1838), Yale Center for British Art
- Via delle Scuole, Pompeii (1838), Chazen Museum of Art
- Job Offering a Sacrifice on His Return to Prosperity, with John Linnell (1845), Fitzwilliam Museum

=== Exhibitions and reassessment ===
Via delle Scuole, Pompeii (1838) was shown at the Victoria and Albert Museum's 1926 exhibition as Street of Tombs, Pompeii (catalogue no. 43), lent by her son A. H. Palmer. His catalogue entry described it as drawn on the spot by Hannah when she was about twenty, while living among the excavations with her husband. The painting was also exhibited at the British Museum in 2005–2006 and at the Chazen in 2007–2008 and 2012.

In 1984 the Fitzwilliam Museum's exhibition Samuel Palmer and The Ancients included Below Papigno (no. 149), a watercolour and body colour of 1839 by Hannah. It was lent anonymously and had passed by descent from John Linnell to an English private owner.

The Flight into Egypt, an oil on canvas, was exhibited in 1956–1957 and in 1984 (no. 148) as a work by John Linnell. In his 1984 entry Raymond Lister suggested that it was by Hannah, and the artist Sir Lawrence Gowing, who owned it, noted his agreement. It was sold at Christie's in December 2022 as attributed to Hannah Palmer, for £8,190.
