= William Linnell =

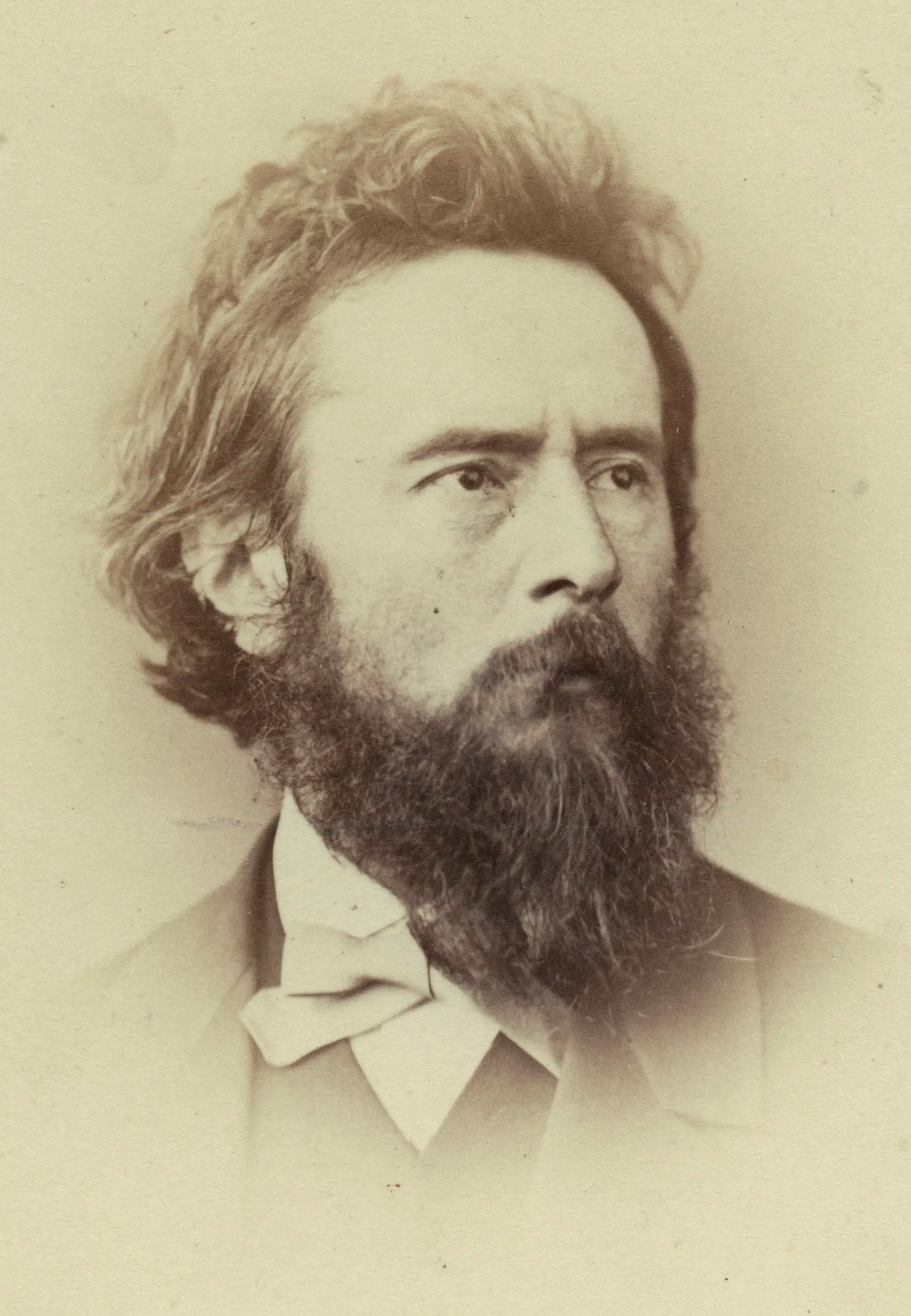
Portrait by Elliott & Fry, 1860s

Willian Linnell (1826 – 1906) was a British painter and draftsman. London born, he was the son of the painter John Linnell (1792-1882).

Linnell is particularly noted for his 1840 drawing of Smugglerius, which is an écorché sculpture of a man posed in imitation of the ancient Roman sculpture known as the Dying Gaul.

His work is held in the permanent collection of the Fitzwilliam Museum at Cambridge University, the Tate Museum in London, and the National Gallery of Art in Washington, D.C..
