= Smugglerius =

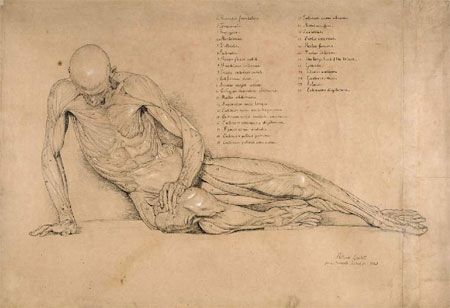
William Linnell's drawing of Smugglerius

Smugglerius is an écorché sculpture of a man posed in imitation of the ancient Roman sculpture known as the Dying Gaul. The original bronze cast was made in 1776 by Agostino Carlini for William Hunter, first Professor of Anatomy at the Royal Academy Schools, from the body of a muscular criminal, flayed after he was hanged at Tyburn. The criminal was thought to be a smuggler, and so the cast of his body was given the mocking cod Latin name "Smugglerius".

The original bronze cast has been lost, but plaster cast copies made by William Pink in 1854 survive at the Royal Academy Schools in London and at Edinburgh College of Art. It is the best (and the best preserved) of the anatomical casts held by the Royal Academy, and has been sketched by many art students. A particularly famous drawing was made by William Linnell in 1840, and now held by the Fitzwilliam Museum in Cambridge.

Research in 2010 tentatively identified the "smuggler" as James Langar, hanged on 12 April 1776 after being convicted at the Old Bailey on 21 February as a footpad (convicted on two charges, and acquitted on two other charges). However, Langar was not sentenced to be dissected and anatomized (unlike, for example, Thomas Henman and Benjamin Harley, smugglers convicted of murdering a customs officer on 22 May 1776 and executed 5 days later).

The subject may be inspired by earlier works such as Bernardino Genga's 1691 book Anatomia, which includes écorché drawings of classical sculptures, including the Farnese Hercules, Laocoön and the Borghese Gladiator.
