= Kensington Gravel Pits (painting) =

Painting by John Linnell

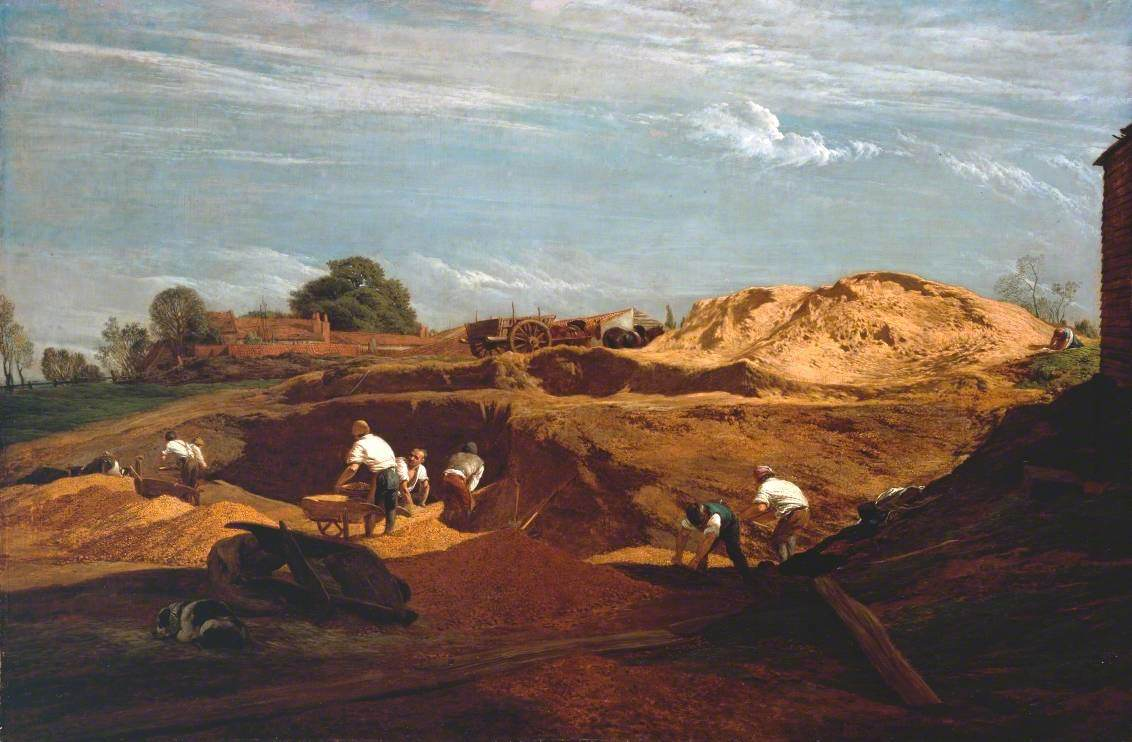
- Artist: John Linnell
- Year: 1811–12
- Type: Oil on canvas, Landscape painting
- Dimensions: 71.1 cm × 106.7 cm (28.0 in × 42.0 in)
- Location: Tate Britain, London

Kensington Gravel Pits is an 1812 landscape painting by the British artist John Linnell.

Kensington Gravel Pits was a village located on the rural western outskirts of London, now part of Notting Hill at the junction of Bayswater Road and Kensington Church Street. It took its name from the gravel pits located there, used for as building materials for the capital's expanding West End. The workers are shown digging out the gravel and then sieving it out into various grades in order to be used in the varying forms of construction. Linnell and another young artist William Mulready lived in the village, which was popular with other artists during the Regency era including Augustus Wall Callcott and Thomas Webster. Linnell likely completed it after moving to new lodgings on the Edgware Road.

It was exhibited at the British Institution in 1813. Today it is in the collection of the Tate Britain in Pimlico having been acquired in 1947.

== Bibliography ==
- Rudwick, Martin J. S. Bursting the Limits of Time: The Reconstruction of Geohistory in the Age of Revolution. University of Chicago Press, 2008.
- Story, Alfred Thomas. The Life of John Linnell, Volume 1. Richard Bentley and Son, 1892.
- Tutton, Michael. Construction as Depicted in Western Art: From Antiquity to the Photograph. Amsterdam University Press, 2021.
