= John Linnell (painter) =

British artist (1792–1882)

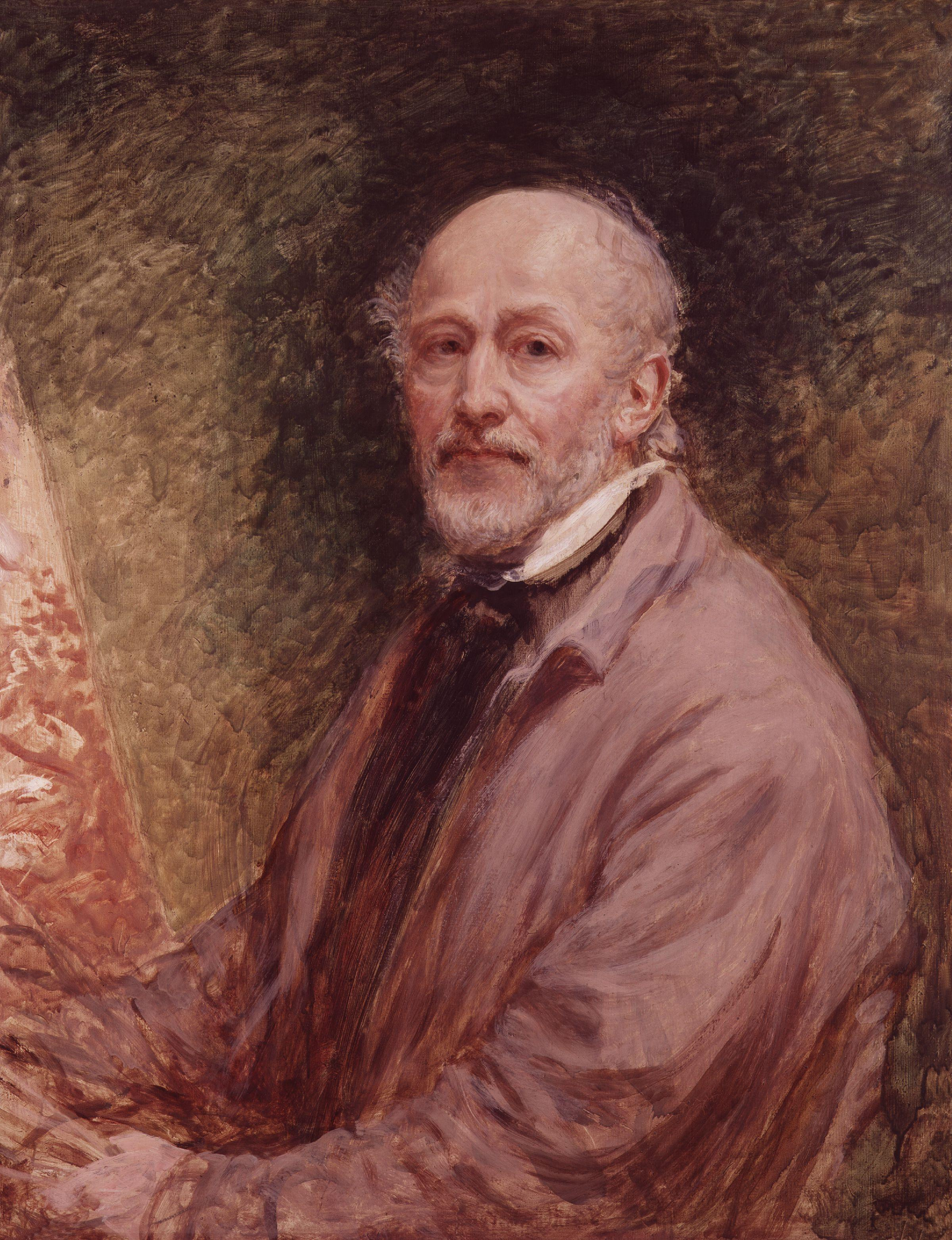
- Self-portrait of John Linnell (c. 1860)
- Born: June 16, 1792
- Died: January 20, 1882 (aged 89)
- Citizenship: British
- Occupations: Portrait and landscape painter and engraver
- Spouse: Mary Ann Palmer (m. 1817)
- Children: Hannah Linnell

John Linnell (16 June 1792 – 20 January 1882) was an English engraver, portrait painter, and landscape painter. He was a naturalist and a rival to the artist John Constable. He had a taste for Northern European art of the Renaissance, particularly Albrecht Dürer. He also associated with the amateur artist Edward Thomas Daniell, and with William Blake, to whom he introduced the painter and writer Samuel Palmer and others of the Ancients.

== Life and work ==
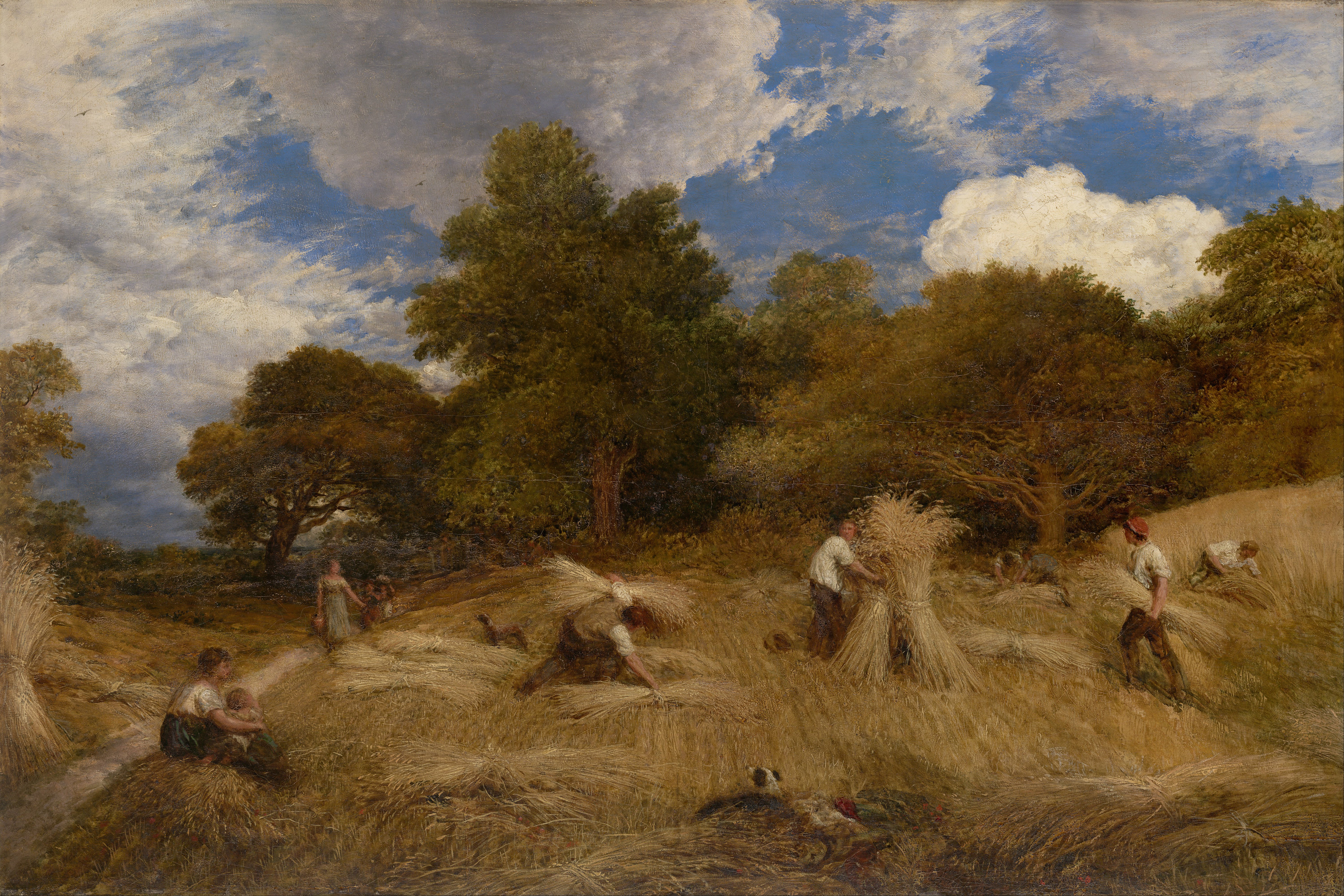
Wheat (c.1860)

John Linnell was born in Bloomsbury, London on 16 June 1792, where his father was a carver and gilder. He was in contact with artists from an early age, and by the age of ten was drawing and selling portraits in chalk and pencil. His first art teacher was the American-born artist Benjamin West, and he spent a year in the house of the painter John Varley, where William Hunt and William Mulready were also pupils, and made the acquaintance of Shelley, Godwin and others. In 1805 he was admitted to study at the Royal Academy, where he obtained medals for drawing, modelling and sculpture. He was trained as an engraver, and executed a transcript of Varley's "Burial of Saul."

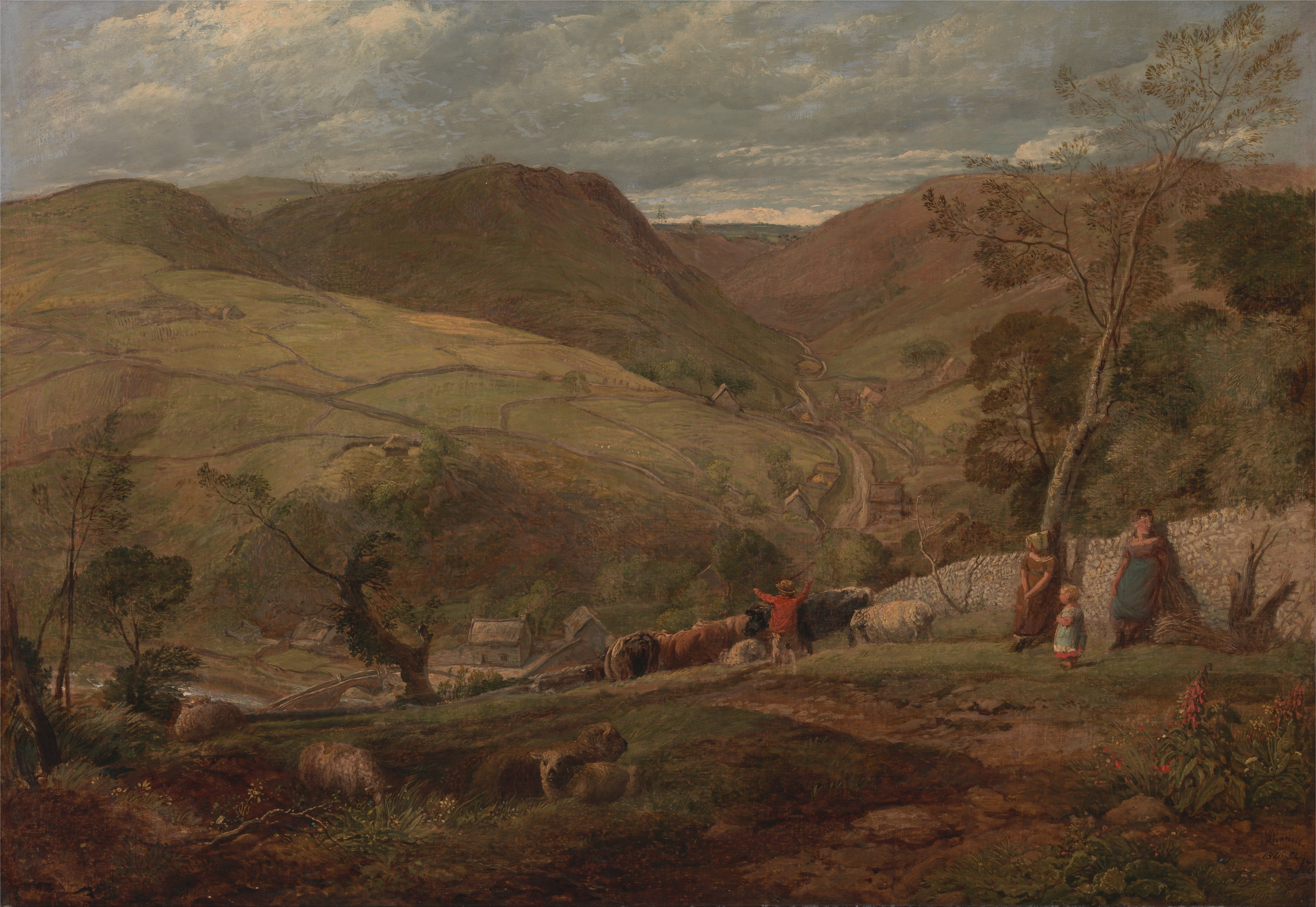
View in Dovedale (1815)

In 1808, the 16-year-old Linnell moved into Mulready's house, whose wife had accused him of infidelity with both other women and boys. Linnell's association with Mulready may have caused the breakup of Mulready's marriage.

In 1817 Linnell married Mary Ann Palmer in Scotland and they had nine children together including their first born, Hannah Linnell, who later married the landscape painter Samuel Palmer.

In later life Linnell occupied himself with the burin, publishing, in 1833, a series of outlines from Michelangelo's frescoes in the Sistine Chapel, and, in 1840, superintending the issue of a selection of plates from the pictures in Buckingham Palace, one of them, a Titian landscape, which he engraved in mezzotint. At first he supported himself mainly by miniature painting and execution of larger portraits, such as the likenesses of Mulready, Richard Whately, Peel and Thomas Carlyle. Several of his portraits he engraved in line and mezzotint.

He painted many subjects like the "St John Preaching", the "Covenant of Abraham", and the "Journey to Emmaus", in which, while the landscape is usually prominent the figures are of sufficient importance to supply the title of the work. However, it is mainly in connection with paintings of pure landscapes that his name is known. His works commonly deal with some scene of typical uneventful English landscape, which is made impressive by a gorgeous effect of sunrise or sunset. They are full of true poetic feeling, and are rich and glowing in colour.

Linnell commanded large prices for his pictures, and about 1850 he purchased a property at Redhill, Surrey, where he lived until his death on 20 January 1882, painting with unabated powers until within the last few years of his life. He devoted himself to painting landscapes notably of the North Downs and Kentish Weald. His leisure was occupied with a study of the Bible in the original language. He also published several pamphlets and treatises of Biblical criticism. Linnell was one of the best friends and kindest patrons of William Blake. He gave him the two largest commissions he received for single series of designs—£150 for drawings and engravings of The Inventions to the Book of Job, and a like sum for those illustrative of Dante Alighieri.

He was a friend of the painter Edward Thomas Daniell. A blue plaque commemorates Linnell at Old Wyldes' at North End, Hampstead. The plaque mentions that William Blake stayed with Linnell as his guest.

His eldest son William Linnell (1826 – 1906) was also an artist most noted for his 1840 drawing of Smugglerius, which is an écorché sculpture of a man posed in imitation of the ancient Roman sculpture known as the Dying Gaul.

== Gallery ==
=== Landscapes ===
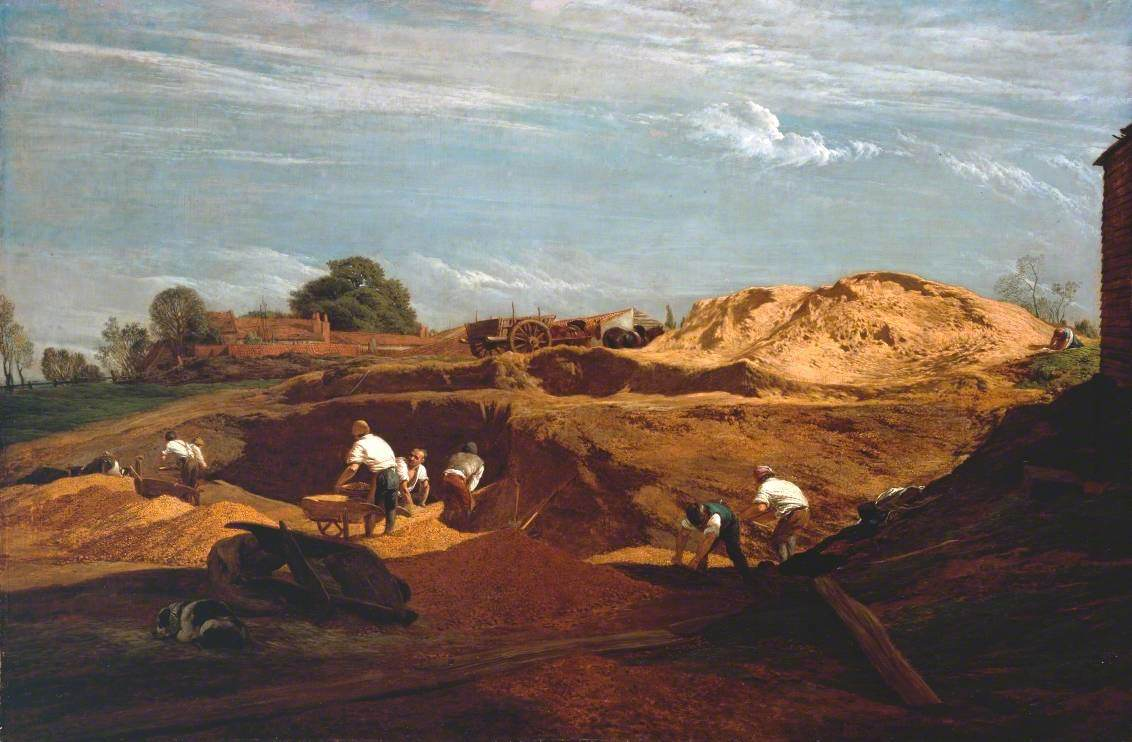
Kensington Gravel Pits (1811–1812), Tate Britain

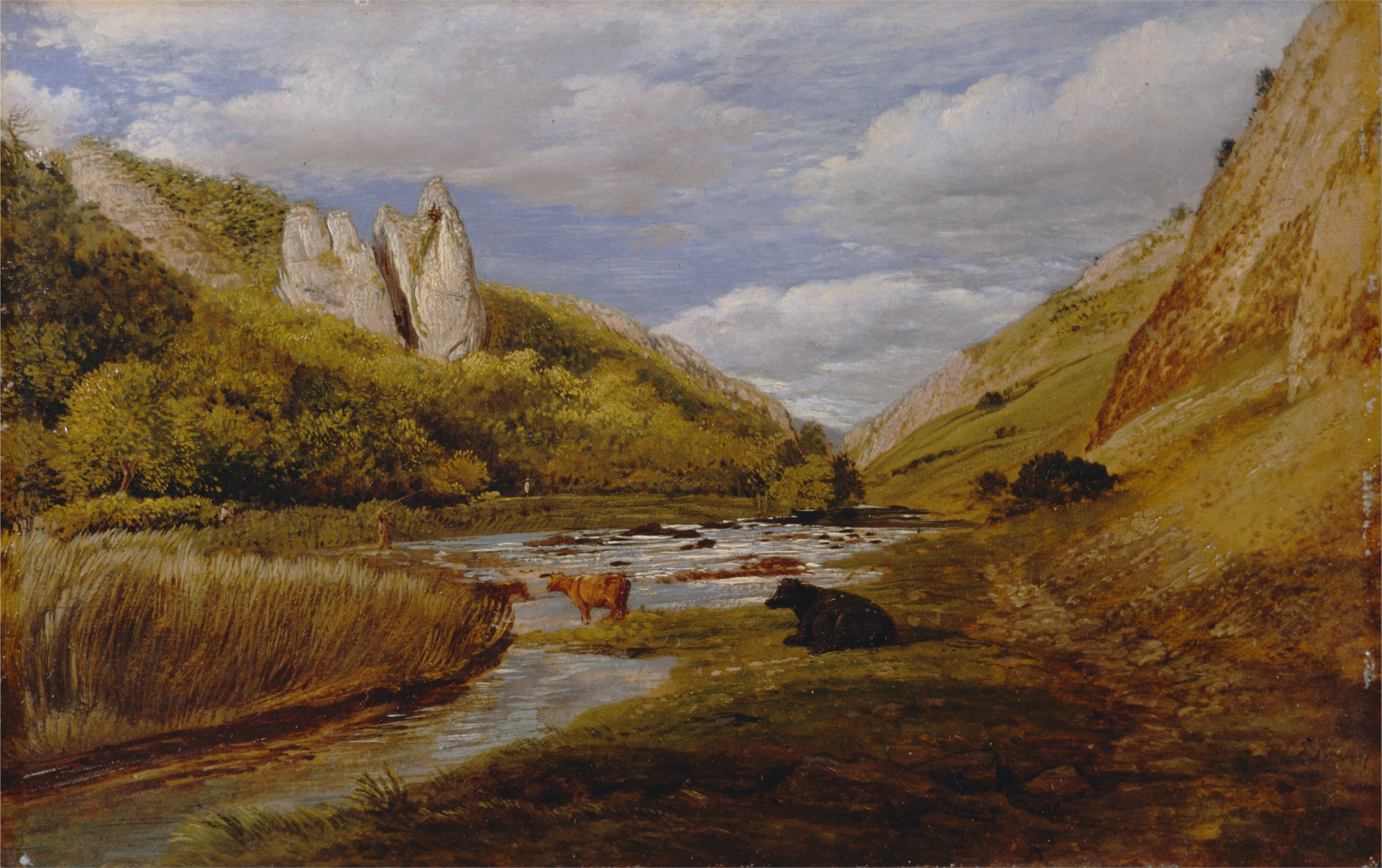
In Dovedale (1814), Yale Center for British Art

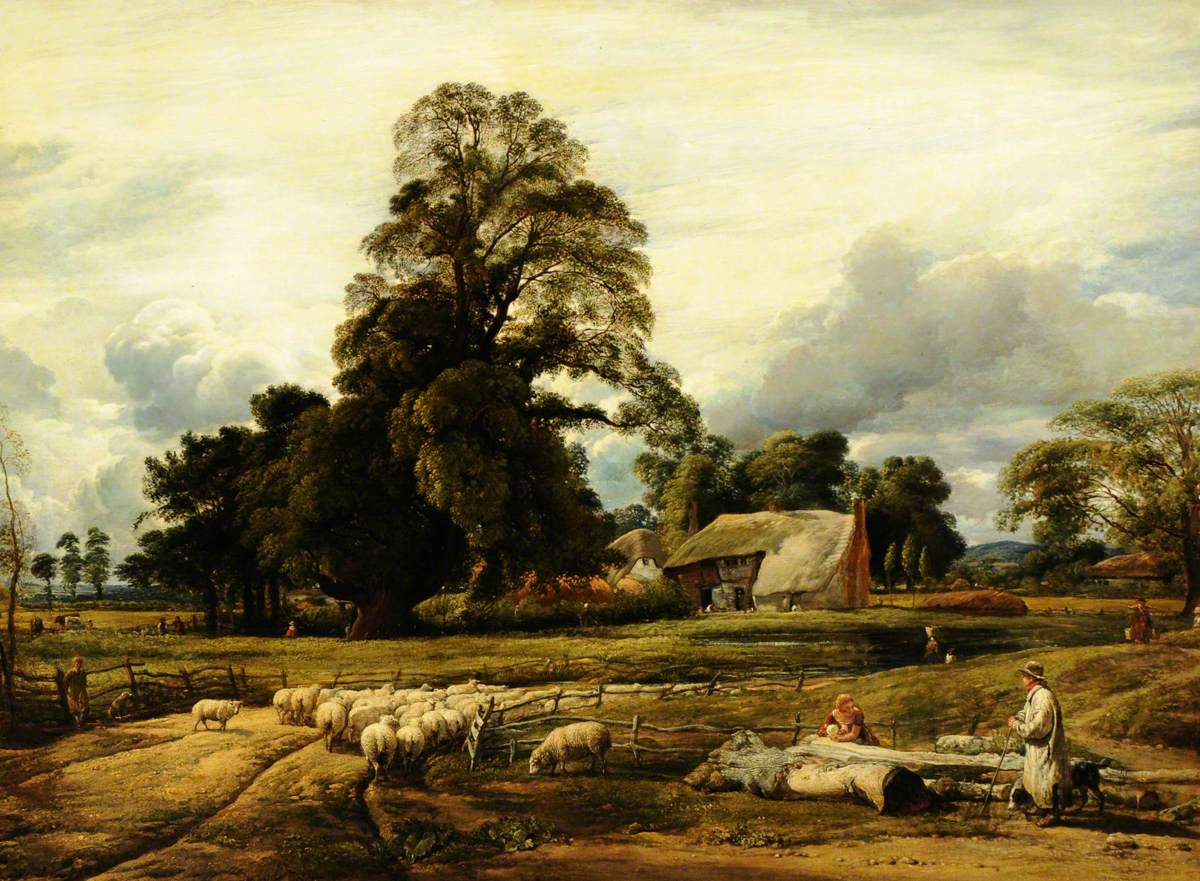
Kingsey Village (1826), Calke Abbey

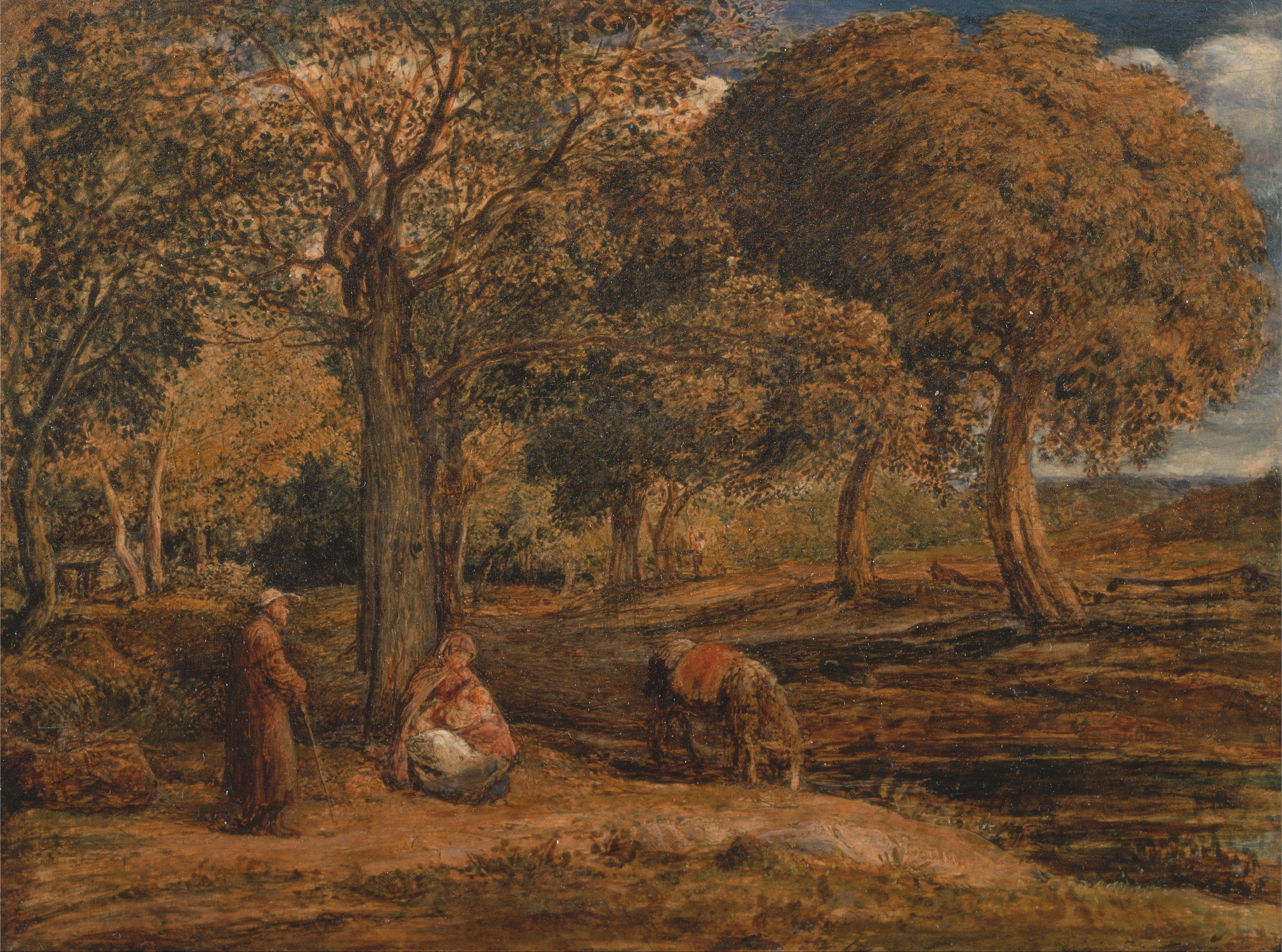
The Rest on the Flight into Egypt (c.1827), Yale Center for British Art

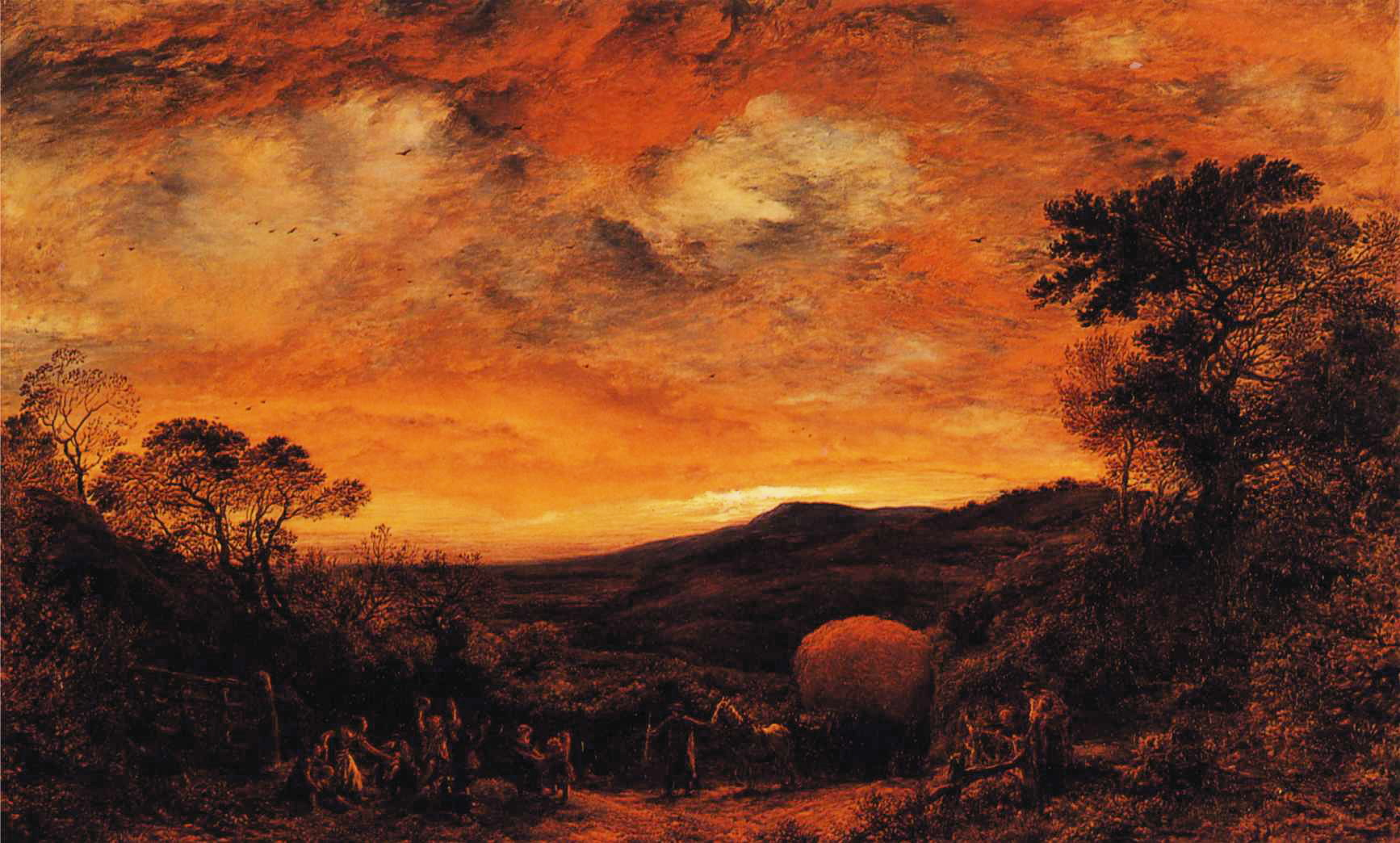
The Last Load (1853), Tate Britain

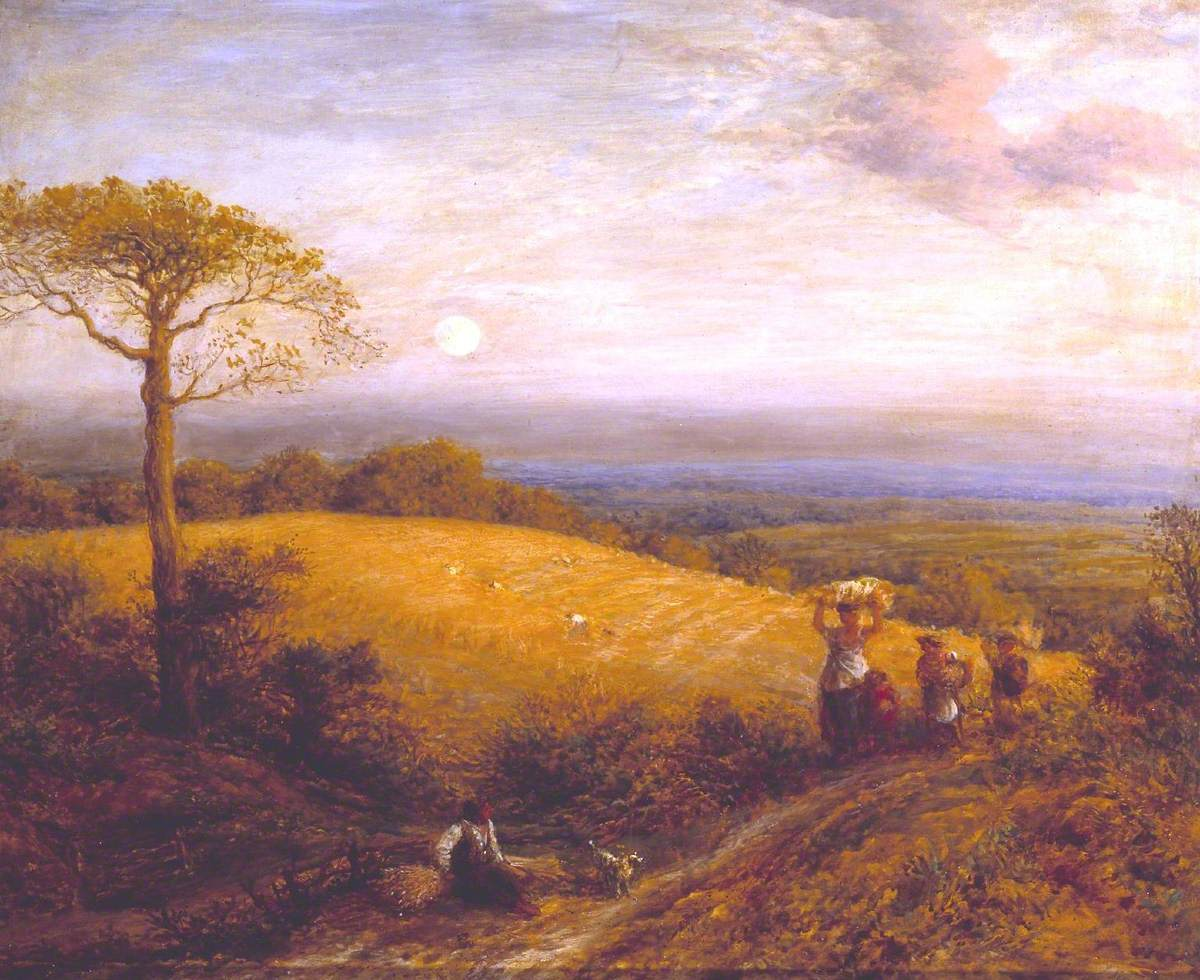
Harvest Moon (1858), Tate Britain

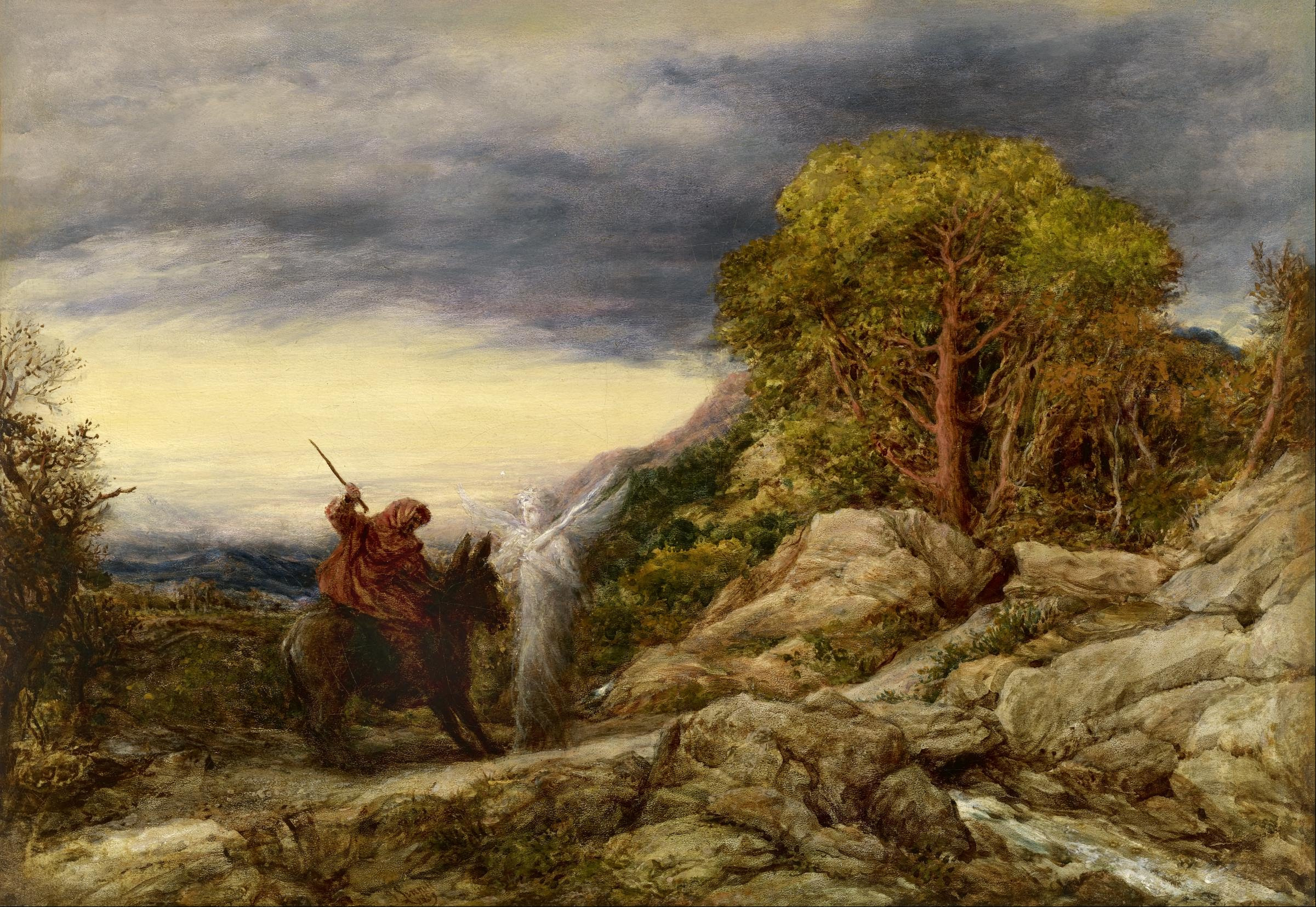
The Prophet Balaam and the Angel (1859), Museum of Fine Arts, Houston

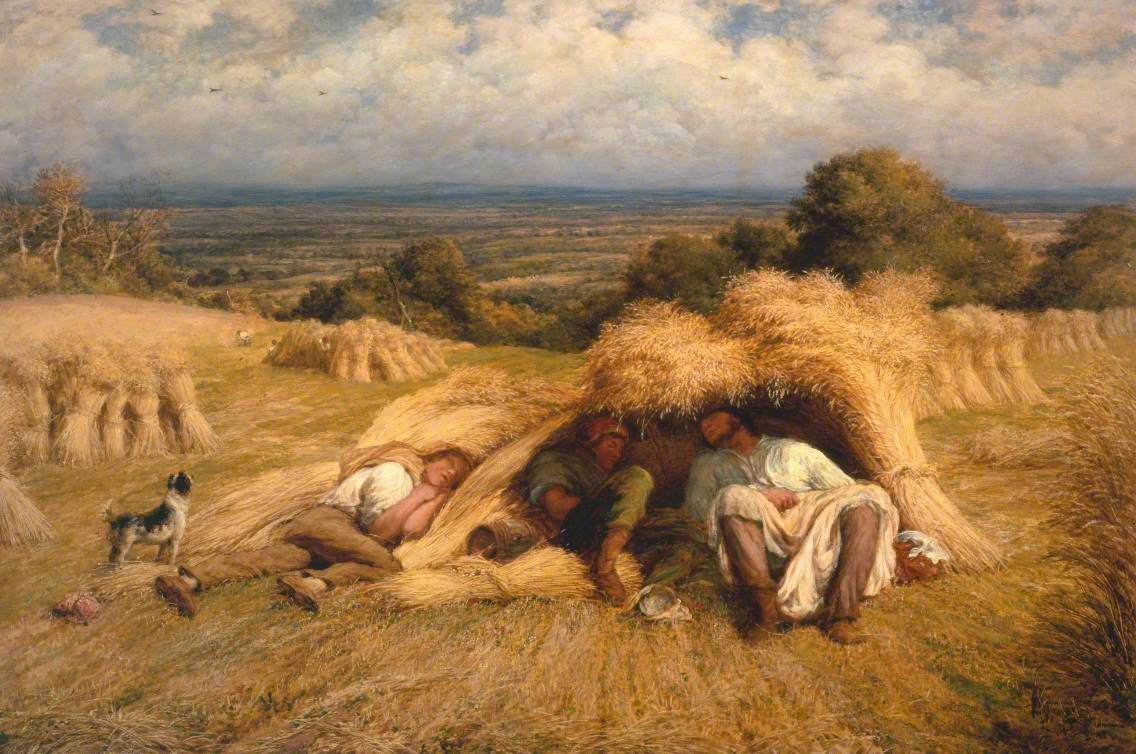
Reapers, Noonday Rest (1865), Tate Britain

=== Portraits ===
Mrs William Wilberforce and Child, 1824

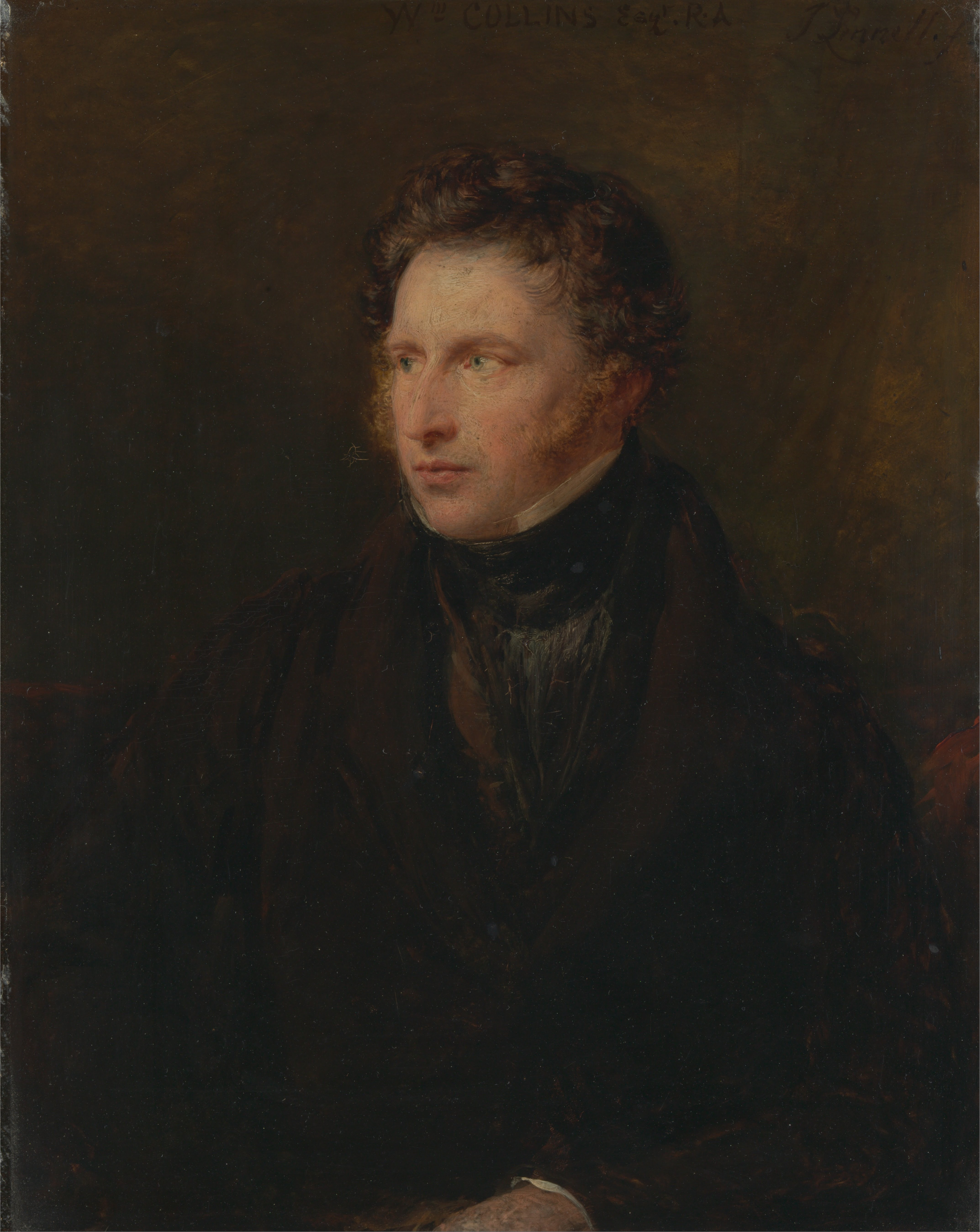
William Collins (1831)

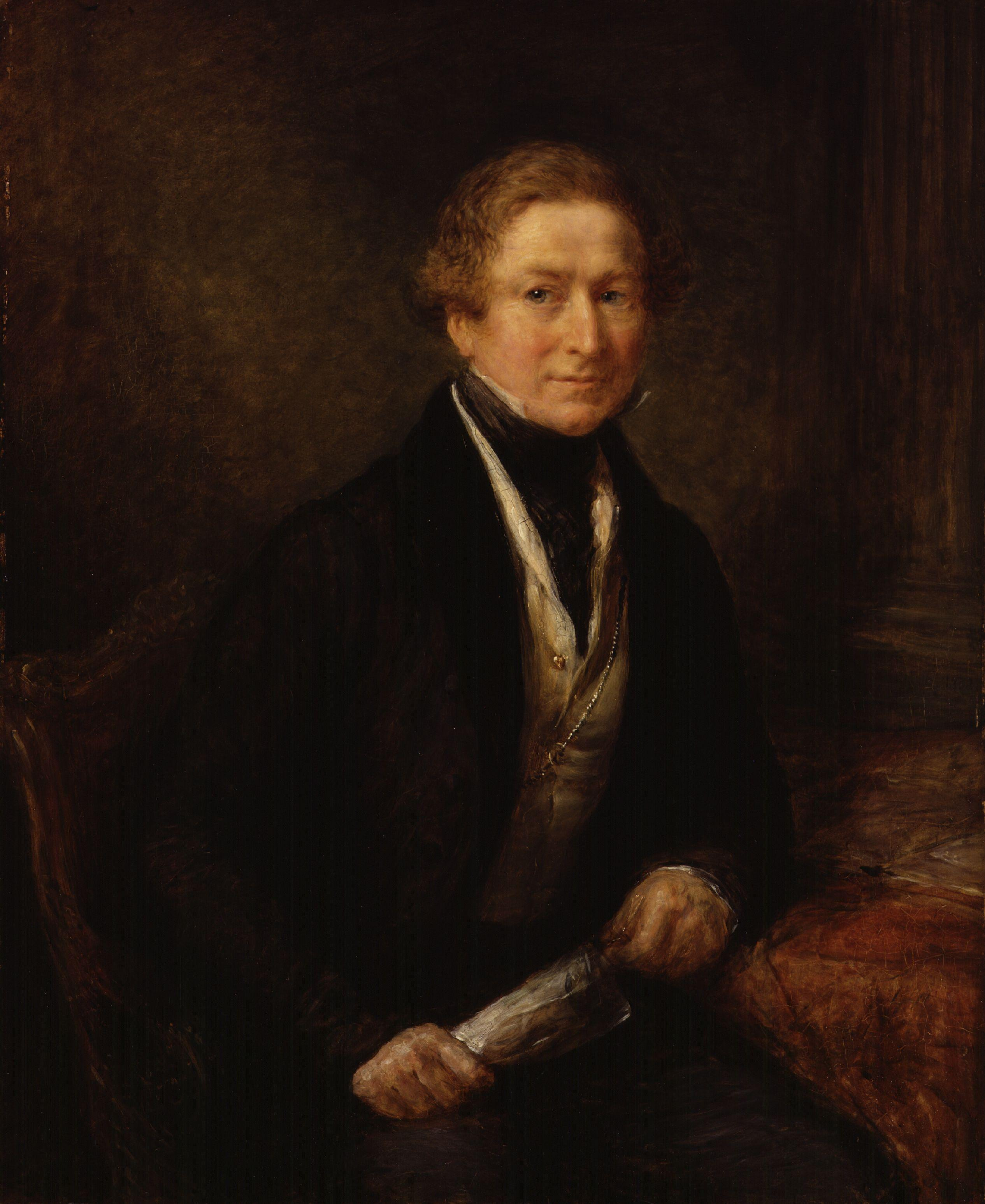
Portrait of Sir Robert Peel (1838)

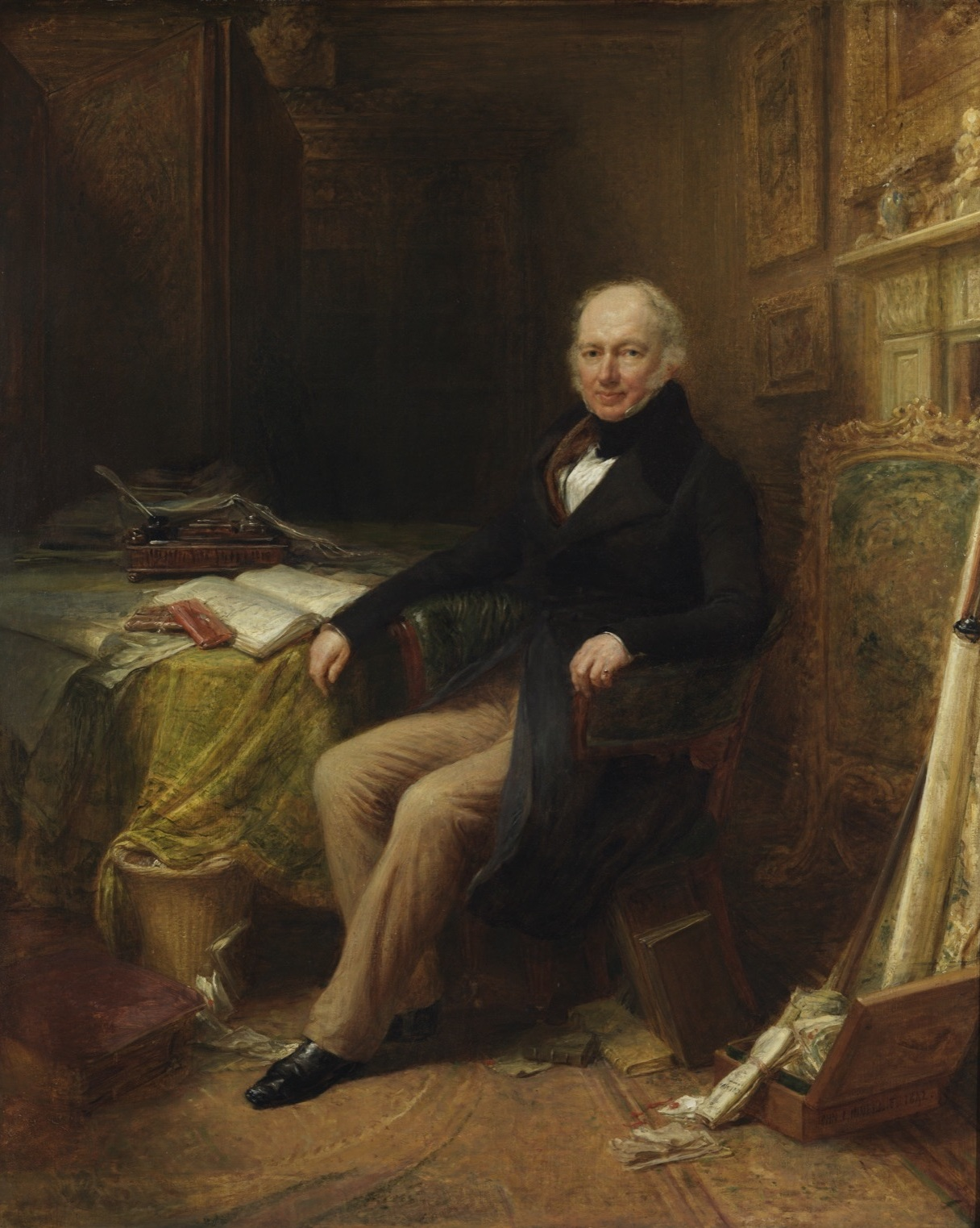
Thomas Baring (1842)

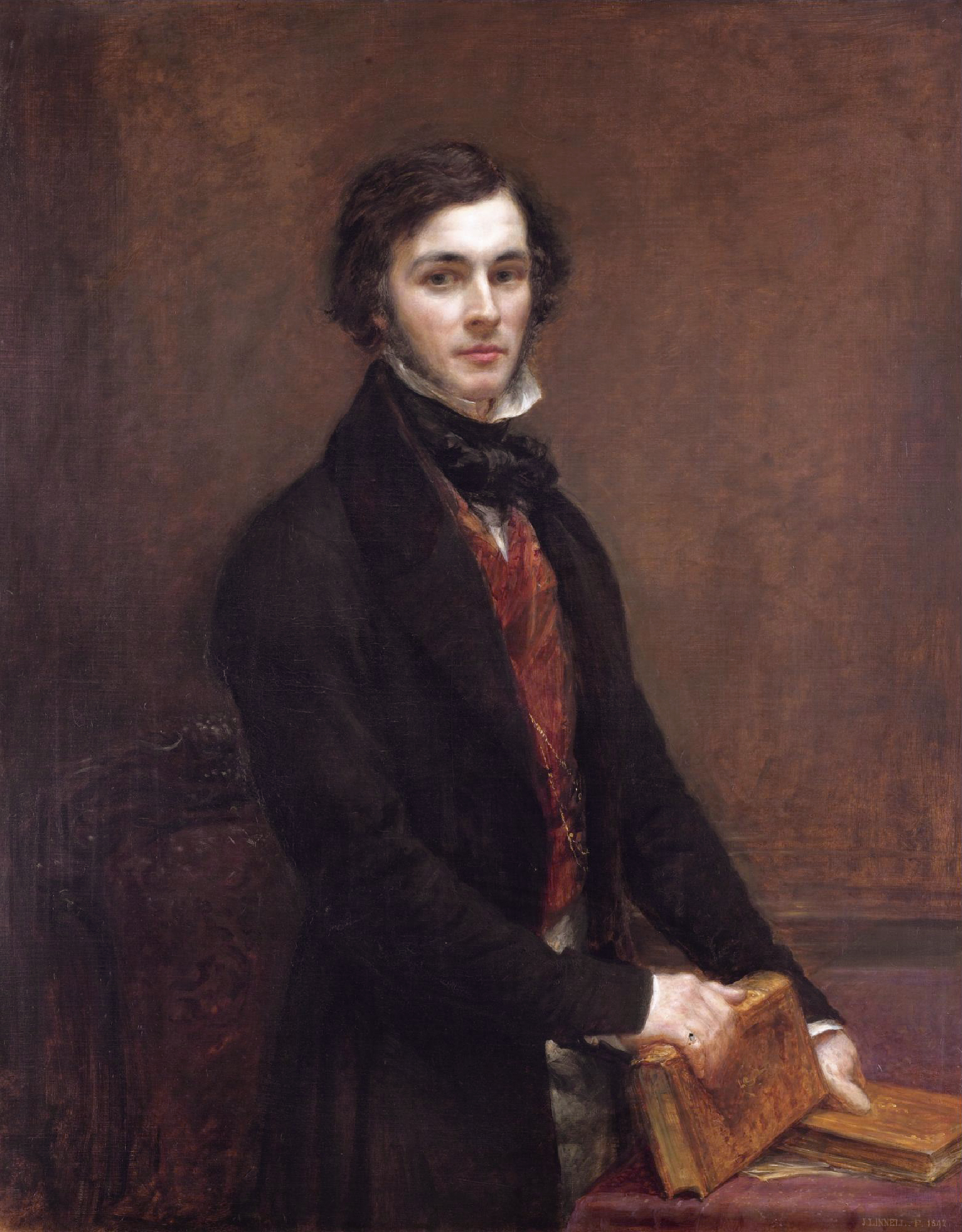
William Coningham (1842)

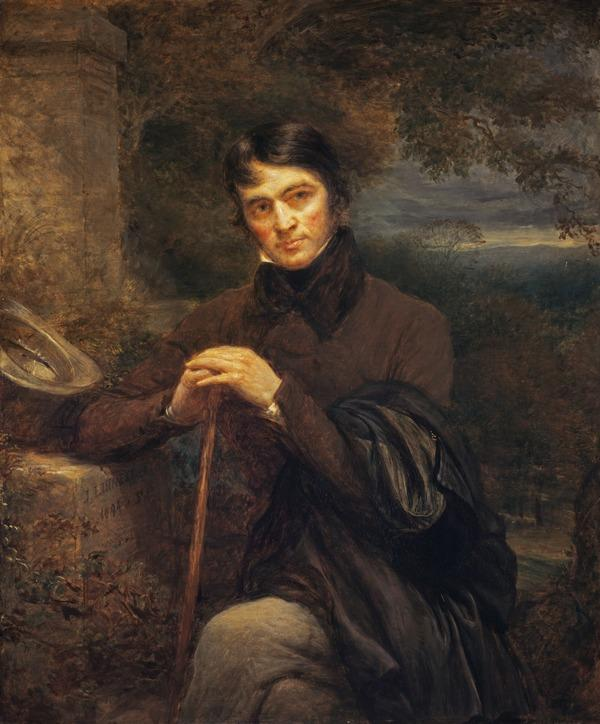
Thomas Carlyle (1844)

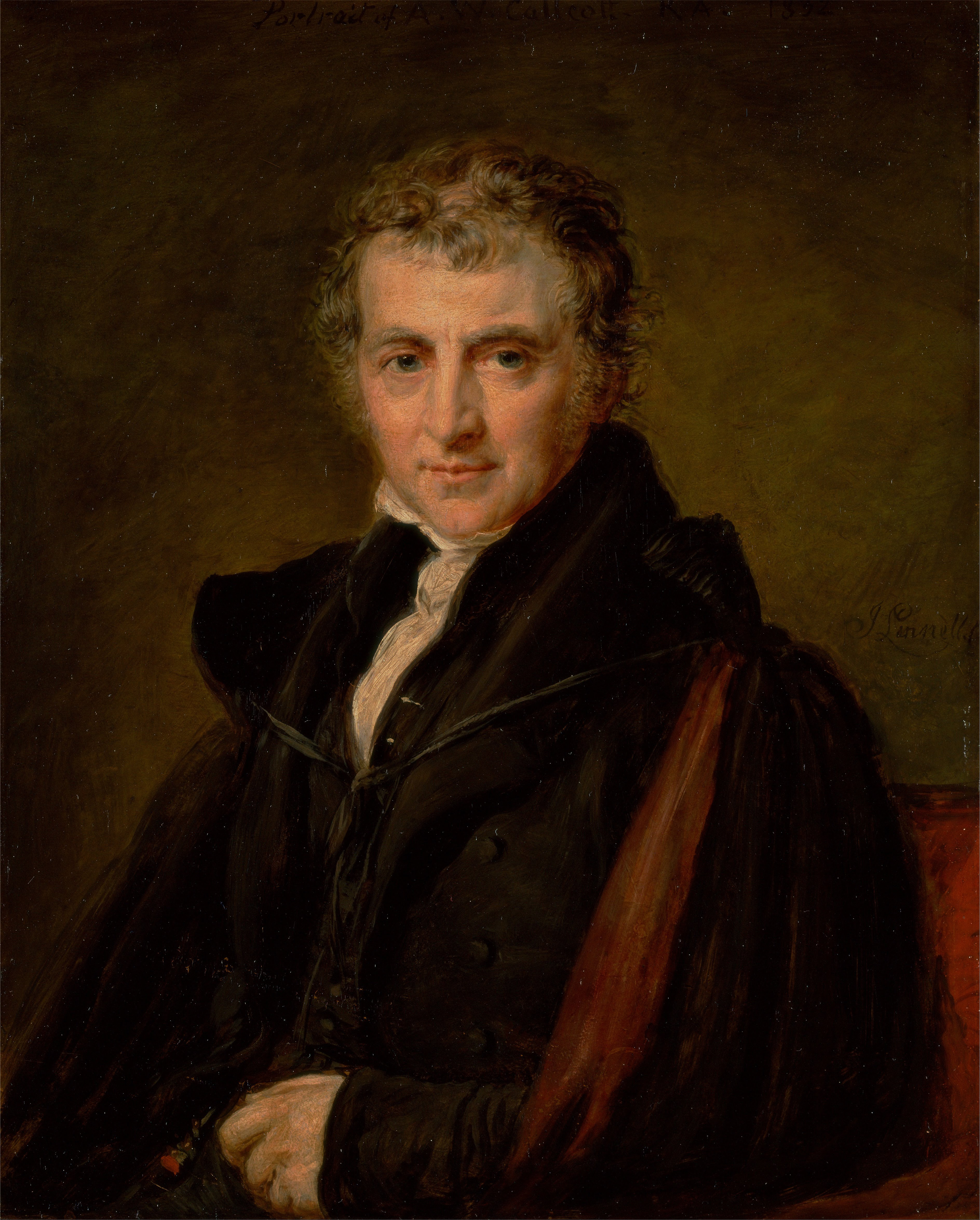
Augustus Wall Callcott (1847)

== Sources ==
This article incorporates text from a publication now in the public domain: Lee, Sidney, ed. (1893). "Linnell, John". Dictionary of National Biography. Vol. 33. London: Smith, Elder & Co.

- Chisholm, Hugh, ed. (1911). "Linnell, John" . Encyclopædia Britannica (11th ed.). Cambridge University Press.
- Clairmont, Clara Mary Jane; Clairmont, Charles; Godwin, Fanny Imlay; Stocking, Marion Kingston (1995). The Clairmont correspondence : letters of Claire Clairmont, Charles Clairmont, and Fanny Imlay Godwin. Volume 1: 1080-1834. Baltimore: Johns Hopkins University Press. ISBN 9-780-80184-633-5.
- Wilton, Andrew; Lyles, Anne (1993). The great age of British watercolours: 1750-1880. Munich: Prestel. ISBN 9-783-79131-879-0.
- Baskett, John; Snelgrove, Dudley; Egerton, Judy (1972). English Drawings and Watercolors, 1550-1850: In the Collection of Mr. and Mrs. Paul Mellon. Pierpont Morgan Library and Paul Mellon (1st ed.). New York: Harper & Row. pp. 132–133. ISBN 978-0-87598-035-5. LCCN 77190656.
