= List of political party songs =

Many political parties and other political movements have adopted a song or anthem to represent their beliefs and principles. This party song or party anthem is often sung or performed at party conferences.

== Algeria ==
- National Liberation Front – Kassaman

== Angola ==
- People's Movement for the Liberation of Angola – Hino do MPLA

== Argentina ==
- Justicialist Party – Peronist March
- Radical Civic Union – Marcha Radical

== Austria ==
- Social Democratic Party of Austria – Lied der Arbeit

== Bangladesh ==
- Bangladesh Awami League – Pralayollas

== Brazil ==
- Worker's Party – O Hino do Partido Trabalhadores

== Bulgaria ==
- Bulgarian Communist Party – The Internationale

== Cambodia ==
- Cambodian People's Party - Anthem of the Cambodian People's Party
- National United Front for an Independent, Neutral, Peaceful and Cooperative Cambodia (FUNCINPEC) - Victory! FUNCINPEC Party

== Canada ==
- Co-operative Commonwealth Federation – CCF Song

== Chile ==
- National Renewal – Himno Renovación Nacional
- Unidad Popular - "Venceremos"
- Mi General, Augusto Pinochet

== China ==
- Chinese Communist Party – The Internationale

== Colombia ==
- Colombian Conservative Party – Himno Partido Conservador Colombiano
- Colombian Liberal Party – Himno Oficial Partido Liberal Colombiano

== Côte d'Ivoire ==
- Rally of the Republicans – Hymne du RDR (Le Républicain)

== Croatia ==
- Croatian Peasant Party – Slavni sine hrvatskoga roda

== Denmark ==
- Social Democrats – Når jeg ser et rødt flag smælde

== Dominican Republic ==
- Dominican Liberation Party – Himno del Partido de la Liberacion Dominicana
- Dominican Revolutionary Party – Himno del Partido Revolucionario Dominicano
- Modern Revolutionary Party – Himno del Partido Revolucionario Moderno
- Social Christian Reformist Party – Himno del Partido Reformista Social Cristiano

== East Germany ==
- Socialist Unity Party of Germany – Song of the Party

== France ==
- Socialist Party - Changer la vie

== Gabon ==
- Gabonese Democratic Party – Hymne du Parti Démocratique Gabonais

== Georgia ==
- Conservative Party of Georgia – Chemo k’argo kveq’ana

== Germany ==
- Die PARTEI - Lied der PARTEI

== Ghana ==
- National Democratic Congress – Arise, Arise for Ghana
- New Patriotic Party - We are the New Patriotic Party

== Greece ==
- Golden Dawn Party – Ymnos Chrysís Avgís
- New Democracy – Néa Dimokratía

== Guinea-Bissau ==
- African Party for the Independence of Guinea and Cape Verde – Esta É a Nossa Pátria Bem Amada

== Honduras ==
- Christian Democratic Party of Honduras – Himno Partido Democracia Cristiana de Honduras
- Liberal Party of Honduras – Himno del Partido Liberal de Hondura
- National Party of Honduras – Himno Partido Nacional de Honduras

== Indonesia ==
- Democratic Party – Hymne Partai Demokrat
- Indonesian Democratic Party of Struggle – Hymne PDI Perjuangan
- Indonesian Solidarity Party – Hymne PSI
- National Awakening Party – Mars PKB
- National Mandate Party – Mars PAN
- Perindo Party – Hymne Perindo
- People's Conscience Party – Mars Hanura
- United Development Party – Mars PPP

== Ireland ==
- Fianna Fáil – Soldiers of the Legion of the Rearguard
- Labour Party – The Red Flag

== Israel ==
- Likud – Betar Hymn

== Italy ==
- Christian Democracy – O bianco fiore
- Forza Italia – Inno di Forza Italia
- Italian Communist Party – Bandiera rossa
- National Fascist Party – Giovinezza

== Japan ==
- Imperial Rule Assistance Association – Anthem of the Taisei Yokusankai
- Liberal Democratic Party – We

== Kazakhstan ==
- Nur Otan – Elim Menin

== Malaysia ==
- Democratic Action Party – Berjuang Untuk Rakyat Malaysia!
- Liberal Democratic Party – Liberal Democratic Party Song
- Malaysian Chinese Association – Ma Hua Dang Ge
- Malaysian Islamic Party – Berjihadlah
- Malaysian People's Party – Demi Rakyat
- Malaysian People's Movement Party – Satu Hati
- Malaysian United Indigenous Party – Perjuangan Kita
- National Trust Party – Lagu Parti Amanah
- People's Justice Party – Arus Perjuangan Bangsa
- Sarawak United Peoples' Party – SUPP Party Song
- United Bumiputera Heritage Party – March PBB
- United Malays National Organisation – Bersatu Bersetia Berkhidmat

== Mali ==
- Union for the Republic and Democracy – l'Union

== Malta ==
- Labour Party – L-Innu tal-Partit Laburista
- Nationalist Party – Sbejħa Patrija

== Mongolia ==
- Democratic Party of Mongolia – Khonkhny duu

== Mozambique ==
- FRELIMO – Hino da FRELIMO

== Myanmar ==
- Pa-O National Organisation – Pa-O National Song

== Nazi Germany ==
- NSDAP – The Horst Wessel Song

== Nicaragua ==
- Sandinista National Liberation Front – Himno a la Unidad Sandinista

== North Korea ==
- Workers' Party of Korea – Long Live the Workers' Party of Korea

== Pakistan ==
- Pakistan Tehreek-e-Insaf – Naya Pakistan

== Paraguay ==
- Colorado Party – Himno del Partido Colorado

== Peru ==
- Popular Action – Marcha del Partido AP

== Philippines ==
- Kilusang Bagong Lipunan – Bagong Pagsilang
- Partido Demokratiko Pilipino-Lakas ng Bayan – Pambansang Martsa ng PDP–Laban
- Communist Party of the Philippines – Pandaigdigang Awit ng mga Manggagawa

== Poland ==
- Law and Justice – Hymn Prawa i Sprawiedliwości
- Polish People's Party – Rota
- Spring – Piosenka Wiosny

== Portugal ==
- Portuguese Communist Party – Avante Camarada
- Social Democratic Party – Paz, Pão, Povo e Liberdade
- Socialist Party – Socialismo em Liberdade

== Puerto Rico ==
- Popular Democratic Party – Jalda Arriba

== Romania ==
- National Liberal Party – Verde-nrourat

== Russia ==
- A Just Russia — For Truth – Gimn partii Spravedlivaya Rossiya
- Communists of Russia – Gimn Partii Bolshevikov
- Communist Party of the Russian Federation – The Internationale
- Liberal Democratic Party of Russia – Velikaya Rossiya
- United Russia – Gimn partii Edinaya Rossiya
- Russian Liberation Army - My Idyom Shirokimi Polyami

== Serbia ==
- Serbian Progressive Party – Tamo daleko
- Serbian Radical Party – Spremte se spremte četnici
- Socialist Party of Serbia – Himna SPS

== Slovenia ==
- Slovenian Democratic Party – Slovenska Pomlad

== South Africa ==
- African National Congress – Nkosi Sikelel' iAfrika

== Soviet Union ==
- Communist Party of the Soviet Union – The Internationale, Bolshevik Party Anthem

== Spain ==
- Traditionalist Communion – Marcha de Oriamendi
- Falange – Cara al Sol

== Syria ==
- Arab Socialist Ba'ath Party – Syria Region – Arab Socialist Ba'ath Party Anthem

== Taiwan ==
- Kuomintang – Three Principles of the People

== Thailand ==
- Democrat party - ประชาธิปัตย์มาแล้ว (Democrats are coming)
- Move Forward Party - "Moving Forward" (ก้าวไกลก้าวหน้า)

== Turkey ==
- Motherland Party – Hadi Bakalim
- Republican People's Party – CHP Özgürlük Marşı

== United Kingdom ==
- British National Party – Jerusalem in England, Londonderry Air in Northern Ireland, Scotland the Brave in Scotland and Land of My Fathers in Wales
- Labour Party – The Red Flag and Jerusalem
- Liberal Party – The Land
- Liberal Democrats – The Land
- Scottish Green Party - "Freedom Come-All-Ye"
- Scottish National Party – Scots Wha Hae
- Socialist Workers Party – The Internationale
- Socialist Party (England and Wales) – The Internationale
- Trades Union Congress – Auld Lang Syne
- British Union of Fascists - Comrades the Voices

== United States ==
- Democratic Party - Happy Days are Here Again Fanfare for the Common Man

== Uruguay ==
- National Party – Marcha de Tres Árboles

== Venezuela ==
- United Socialist Party of Venezuela – La Hora del Pueblo
