= Siegfried Köhler (composer) =

German composer

Siegfried Köhler (2 March 1927 in Meißen – 14 July 1984 in East Berlin) was a German composer in the German Democratic Republic.

== Life ==
During World War II, Köhler worked with a musicians group (Spielschar) within the Hitler Youth organisation. After the end of the war, the Soviet secret police NKVD arrested him and charged him with being a member of the Werwolf. He was detained at the infamous prison Speziallager Nr. 4 in Bautzen. In March 1946 he was transferred into Speziallager Nr. 1 in Mühlberg and on 21 June 1946 he was handed over to the NKVD command in Dresden. He was released there suffering from tuberculosis. Köhler went on to study first Composition in Dresden and then musicology and Art history in Leipzig.

From 1963 to 1968 he worked as an art director at the state-owned music publisher VEB Deutsche Schallplatten in East Berlin. In 1968 he returned to Dresden and became the president of Musikhochschule Dresden. From 1982 until his death he was the president of the Association of Composers and Musicologists of the German Democratic Republic. In 1983 he was appointed as the director of the prestigious opera house Sächsische Staatsoper Dresden. However, he did not live to see the re-opening of the Semperoper in 1985. Köhler died on 14 July 1984 in East Berlin.

Siegfried Köhler's best-known works are the song Heut ist ein wunderschöner Tag (1942) and the Christmas song Tausend Sterne sind ein Dom. His Symphony No. 5 "Pro Pace" (premiered in 1984) is a stunning reminder of the bombing of Dresden in World War II. For the record Peter Schreier singt Weihnachtslieder (1975), Köhler arranged all songs for solo tenor, boys' choir and orchestra.

== Works ==
- Lied vom Leben, Cantata, text by Siegfried Köhler op. 1 (1947)
- Zum Neuen Jahre Glück und Heil. Joyful music set to a text by Johann Wolfgang von Goethe for mixed choir and small orchestra, op. 2 (1954)
- Sechs schlichte Liedweisen, op. 3 (1950)
- Deutschland, also known as Deutsche Motette after poetry by Kurt Barthel for a youth choir of six voices, op. 4
- Besinnung und Aufbruch Cantata for soprano (or tenor), mixed choir and small orchestra after poetry by Johann Wolfgang von Goethe, op. 5 (1951)
- Hausmusik in 5 movements for piano, op. 6 (1952)
- Deutschland, du, unsere Heimat (also known as Heut ist ein wunderschöner Tag). Cantata song for choir and instruments, text by Siegfried Köhler op. 7 (1952)
- Christmas cantata Tausend Sterne sind ein Dom for choir and instruments, text by Siegfried Köhler op. 8 (1951)
- Der Richter von Hohenburg. Scenes from the German Peasants' War 1525, a dramatic play for musical theater, text by Siegfried Köhler, op.10 (1954/1963)
- Fröhliche Suite for orchestra, text by Siegfried Köhler, op. 11 (1956)
- Zehn lyrische Lieder after texts by various authors, op. 12 (1956)
- Heiteres Vorspiel for orchestra op. 13 (1956)
- Drei Galgenlieder after poetry by Christian Morgenstern, op. 14 (1956)
- Lied der Jugend. Eine Kantate zur Jugendweihe und anderen festlichen Anlässen for solo, choir and instruments ad lib., text by Louis Fürnberg op. 15 (1956)
- Spanische Visionen: Der Sieg von Guernica Cantata a capella after poetry by Paul Éluard, op. 16 (1957)
- Sonatine in F for piano, op. 17 (1958)
- Kleine Festmusik for string orchestra (or string quartet with contrabass), op. 18 (1958)
- Sonatine in C for piano, op. 19
- Prolog für Orchester, op. 20 (1959)
- Musik für Kathrin. Twelve children's songs for two-handed piano, op. 21 (1961)
- Vier Lieder nach Dichtungen von Mao Tse-tung, text by Mao Zedong, translated by Rolf Schneider, op. 22 (1961)
- Reich des Menschen, poem for soprano, alto and baritone, mixed choir and orchestra, text by Johannes R. Becher, op. 23 (1961/62)
- Greif zu den Sternen, Kind der Zeit Cantate for the opening of the 4th German Festival of Gymnastics and Sports 1963 in Leipzig, text by Max Zimmering, op. 24 (1963)
- Sinfonie der Jugend op. 25 (1964)
- Die Eheschule. A musical, text by Gerhard Branstner, op. 27 (1964)
- Kambodschanische Festmusik op. 28 (1964)
- Von Liebe und Tod for high singing voice and piano, text by Johannes R. Becher, op. 29 (1965)
- Erde, fruchtbar und schön. Cantata for soprano, mixed choir and string orchestra, op. 30
- Der Struwwelpeter oder Lustige Geschichten und drollige Bilder, ballads for song, dance and narration, text by Heinrich Hoffmann, op. 31 (1966)
- Sketches on Der Struwwelpeter Revision of the piano pieces op. 31a (1966)
- Rotterdam 14 May 1940. Sonata for French horn and piano, op.32 (1966)
- Max und Moritz. Eine Bubengeschichte in sieben Streichen for speaker and chamber orchestra, text by Wilhelm Busch, op. 33 (1967)
- Fipps, der Affe. Unterhaltsames und Ungehöriges, text by Wilhelm Busch, op. 34 (1964)
- Aspekte. Skizzen für Nonett (flute, oboe, clarinet, bassoon, French horn, violin, viola, violoncello, contrabass) and a high singing voice or speaker ad lib., text by Siegfried Köhler, op. 36 (1968)
- Bernauer Liedfolge: Es wächst das Werk in weitem Rund for the 20th anniversary of the German Democratic Republic, text by Willi Layh, op. 37 (1968)
- Concertino für Klarinette und Streichorchester, op. 38 (1969)
- Land meiner Liebe, poem for soprano and orchestra, text by Siegfried Köhler, op. 39 (1969)
- Festliche Ouvertüre for large orchestra, op. 40 (1969)
- Dass unsere Liebe eine Heimat hat, cycle of ten pieces for choir, text by Günther Deicke, op. 41 (1968)
- Bericht über Lenin after a ballade by Wolfgang Tilgner and poetry by Vladimir Mayakovsky, Louis Fürnberg, Kurt Barthel, Johannes R. Becher and Max Zimmering for a speaker and three instrumentalists, op. 42 (1970)
- Liebeslieder am Spinett zu singen, songs for choir, texts by Bertolt Brecht, Paul Fleming, Johannes R. Becher, op. 43 (1970)
- Wir – unsere Zeit, choir symphony after poetry by Johannes R. Becher in six movements, op. 44 (1972)
- Sinfonietta für Orchester in three movements (also known as 2nd Symphony), op. 45 (1971)
- Konzert für Klavier und Orchester, op. 46 (1972)
- Vier Strukturen für Klavier, op. 46a (1973)
- Ode für Tenor Solo, Horn und Streichorchester in four movements, text by Helmut Reibig op. 47 (1971)
- Diagramm, 12 variations for pipe organ, op. 49a (1973)
- Johannes-Bobrowski-Chorbuch Parts I and II. Five madrigals for mixed choir a cappella, text by Johannes Bobrowski, op. 50 (1975)
- Von Bäumen, Knospen und Nachtigallen. Cycle for female or youth choir a cappella, text by Georg Maurer op. 51 (1973)
- Unser das Land und die Zeit. Cycle for mixed choir a cappella, text by Günther Deicke, op. 52 (1973, premiered 1977)
- Konzertante Musik für Orchester in three movements op. 53 (1975)
- Metamorphosen für Orgel über die Ode an die künftige Zeit, text by Pablo Neruda, op. 54 (1972)
- Anja und Peter. A musical fable for children (homage to Sergei Prokofiev), op. 55 (1974)
- Canticum catulli for soli and instruments, op. 56 (1974/75)
- 3rd Symphony op. 57 (1975)
- Sieben Mikroszenen for clarinet, violoncello and piano, op. 58 (1975)
- Konzert für Cembalo und Kammerorchester, op. 59 (1976)
- Der gefesselte Orpheus, essay for orchestra, op. 60 (1976)
- Hommáge à J. S. Bach. Dialogue for two violins op. 61 (1977)
- 4th Symphony, revised as Epitaph für Antigone, op. 62 (1977/78, rev. 1979)
- Kommentare zu drei venezianischen Madrigalen des Heinrich Schütz aus dem Jahr 1611, op. 63 (1978)
- Konzert für Violine und Orchester, op. 64 (1979/80)
- Synthesen. 1st string quartet op. 65 (1977)
- Sinnsprüche, also known as Fest- und Gedenksprüche for choir in eight voices a cappella, op. 66 (1980)
- Festliche Inventionen. Music of the Dresden Renaissance for three choirs and symphony orchestra, op. 70 (1981)
- Sinfonietta für Orchester, op. 71 (1981)
- Musik für Violoncello solo Nr. 1, op. 72 (1980)
- Kontraste. 2nd string quartet, op. 73 (1981)
- Ode an die Solidarität for mixed choir in eight voices a cappella, text by Pablo Neruda, op. 74 (1981)
- Temperamente. Configuration for four flutes (for Jürgen Brüggebors), op. 75 (1981)
- Epigramme für gemischten Chor a capella after poetry by Johann Wilhelm Ludwig Klein, Hans Assmann von Abschatz and Angelus Silesius translated by Franz Liszt, op. 76 (1982)
- Haltungen for clarinet solo, op. 77 (1980)
- 5th Symphony Pro Pace (also known as Auferstehung) for soli, speaker, mixed choir and large orchestra, text by Ulrich Grasnick, op. 78 (1983)

== Literature ==
- Siegfried Köhler and Johannes Weyrauch: Unsere schönsten Weihnachtslieder. 27 beliebte Lieder zur Weihnachtszeit, Leipzig [1970]
- Max Gerd Schönfelder: Siegfried Köhler für Sie porträtiert. Leipzig, 1984 (with a list of works, pp. 65–70).
