= The Land (song) =

Protest song

"The Land" is a protest song, traditionally sung by the Georgist movement in pursuit and promotion of land value taxation. Its first appearance is from a Chicago Georgist publication, The Single Tax, in 1887 as "The Land Song" Until the late 1970s it was sung at the end of each year's Liberal Assembly and was the party anthem of the Liberal Party, until that party merged with the SDP to form the Liberal Democrats. To this day it remains the de facto anthem of the Liberal Democrats, and is sung as the first song of the Liberal Democrats' Glee Club, at the twice-per-year Liberal Democrat Conference, and is the party anthem of the post-1989 Liberal Party. During the chorus, the phrase 'ballot in our hand' is accompanied by the collective waving of any paper to hand (usually a Liberator song book) by the audience.

Michael Foot, leader of the Labour Party from 1980 to 1983, recalled to the BBC World Service how he heard and learned the song while growing up in a Liberal household in the west of England. Foot said it was the best political song he had heard, imbued with the democratic spirit and designed to put fear in the hearts of the landlords.

The song became a Liberal radical anthem in the aftermath of David Lloyd George's "People's Budget" of 1909 which proposed a tax on land. During the two general elections of the following year, "The Land Song" became the governing Liberals' campaign song. Sheet music was published and a 78 rpm disc of the song was released. A recording made at a Glee Club around 1990 has been deposited at the Janey Buchan Political Song Collection in Glasgow. Michael Foot's comments about the song, and snippets of the song itself, featured in a series on political song broadcast on The World Today on the BBC World Service — the entire series is now held by the British Library Sound Archive.

== Lyrics ==
The lyrics have changed slightly over the years. Three versions are included here. The first is from its original 1887 Chicago publication; the second is from a recording issued for the 1910 UK general elections; the third is from the Liberator song book.

(To the tune of "Marching Through Georgia".)

1887 original

Sound a blast for Freedom, boys, and send it far and wide!

March along to victory, for God is on our side!

While the voice of Nature thunders o'er the rising tide—

"God made the Land for the People!"

Chorus:
The Land! the Land!
'twas God who gave the Land!
The Land! the Land!
the ground on which we stand!
Why should we be beggars,
with the ballot in our hand?
"God gave the Land to the People!"

Hark! the shout is swelling from the East and from the West:

Why should we beg work and let the Landlords take the best?

Make them pay their taxes for the Land—we'll risk the rest;

The Land was meant for the People!

Chorus

The banner has been raised on high to face the battle din:

The Army now is marching on the struggle to begin.

We'll never cease our efforts till the victory we win,

And the Land is free for the People!

Chorus

Clear the way for liberty! the land must all be free!

True men will not falter in the fight, though stern it be,

Till the flag we love so well shall wave from sea to sea,

O'er land that's free for the People.

Chorus

1910 version

Sound the blast for freedom, boys, and send it far and wide,

March along to victory, for God is on our side,

While the voice of nature thunders o'er the rising tide:

"God made the land for the people".

Chorus:
The land, the land,
'twas God who gave the land,
The land, the land,
The ground on which we stand,
Why should we be beggars
With the ballot in our hand?
God gave the land to the people.

Hark! The shout is swelling from the east and from the west!

Why should we beg work and let the landlords take the best?

Make them pay their taxes for the land, we'll risk the rest!

The land was meant for the people.

Chorus

The banner has been raised on high to face the battle din,

The army now is marching on, the struggle to begin,

We'll never cease our efforts till the victory we win,

And the land is free for the people.

Chorus

Clear the way for liberty, the land must all be free,

Britons will not falter in the fight tho' stern it be.

Till the flag we love so well shall wave from sea to sea,

O'er the land that's free for the people.

Chorus

Liberator version

Sound the call for freedom boys, and sound it far and wide,

March along to victory for God is on our side,

While the voice of Nature thunders o'er the rising tide,

"God gave the land to the people!"

Chorus:
The land, the land,
'twas God who made the land,
The land, the land,
The ground on which we stand,
Why should we be beggars
With the ballot in our hand?
God made the land for the people.

Hark the sound is spreading from the East and from the West,

Why should we work hard and let the landlords take the best?

Make them pay their taxes on the land just like the rest,

The land was meant for the people.

Chorus

Clear the way for liberty, the land must all be free,

Liberals will not falter from the fight, tho' stern it be,

'Til the flag we love so well shall fly from sea to sea

O'er the land that is free for the people.

Chorus

The army now is marching on, the battle to begin,

The standard now is raised on high to face the battle din,

We'll never cease from fighting 'til the victory we win,

And the land is free for the people.

Chorus

== See also ==
- Liberator (magazine)
- Henry George
- "A Man's A Man for A' That"
- "God Save Ireland"
- "The Internationale"
- "The Red Flag"
- "This Land Is Your Land"
