= Siegfried Köhler =

Siegfried Köhler is the name of:

- Siegfried Köhler (conductor) (1923–2017), German conductor and composer of classical music
- Siegfried Köhler (composer) (1927–1984), German composer of classical music and songs
- Siegfried Köhler (cyclist) (born 1935), German cyclist

== See also ==
- Köhler
