= Blake's Cottage =

Listed building in West Sussex, England

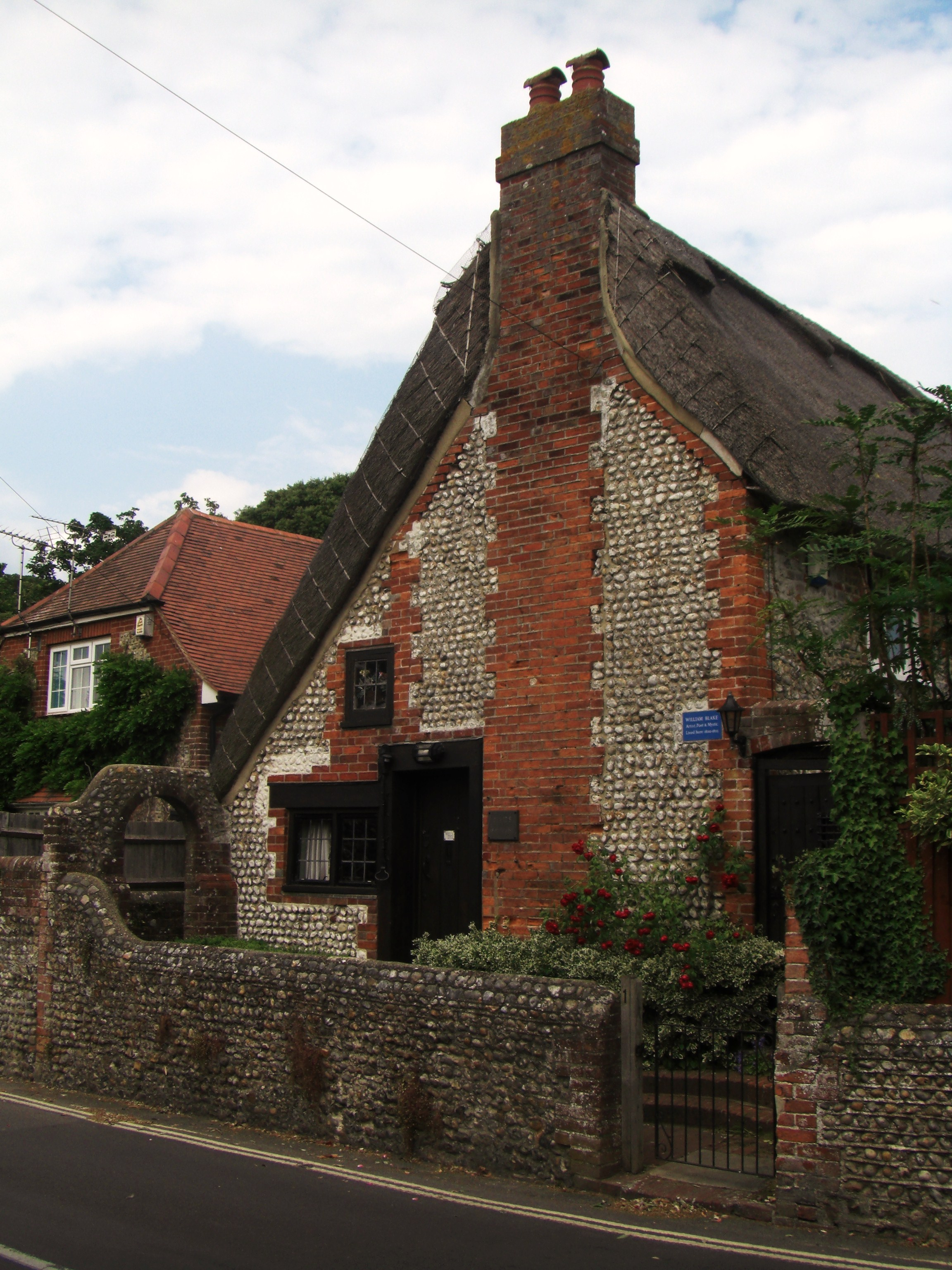
- "Away to sweet Felpham for heaven is there"

- Location within West Sussex

General information
- Architectural style: Vernacular
- Location: Felpham, West Sussex, England
- Coordinates: 50.7887°N 0.6524°W
- Year built: 17th century

Listed Building – Grade II*
- Official name: Blake's Cottage
- Designated: 22 July 1949
- Reference no.: 1353792

Listed Building – Grade II
- Official name: Roadside garden wall with archway linking it to Blake's Cottage
- Designated: 23 July 1998
- Reference no.: 1375729

Blake's Cottage stands in the village of Felpham, West Sussex, England. The house dates from the 17th century. Its name commemorates the occupancy of the poet William Blake, who lived in the cottage from 1800 to 1803. During his time at the house, Blake wrote the verses "And did those feet in ancient time", the preface to his Milton: A Poem in Two Books, which were later set to music as the hymn "Jerusalem". The cottage, owned by a trust, is a Grade II* listed building.

== History and description ==
William Hayley, poet and biographer of his friend William Cowper, began the construction of a house, called The Turret, at Felpham in 1798. In 1800 he invited William Blake, and his wife Catherine, to the village to illustrate his own works. Blake remained at Felpham for three years, residing at his "cot" south of the village church. During his residence Blake wrote much of Milton: A Poem in Two Books, the preface of which was subsequently adapted into the hymn "Jerusalem". The cottage is managed by the Blake's Cottage Trust which bought the building in 2015. The trust has sought to raise funds to undertake restoration of the cottage but this has proved challenging. In 2017 the trust appointed architects to undertake reconstruction and redevelopment though their plans generated some local opposition. In November 2021, concerns regarding the fabric of the building saw the cottage being placed on the 2021 Heritage at Risk Register. The trust aims to complete renovation of the cottage by 2027, the bicentenary of Blake's death.

The original cottage dates from the 17th century. It is of two storeys and is constructed of cob, flint and brick with a thatched roof. It is a Grade II* listed building.

== See also ==
- Grade II* listed buildings in West Sussex

== Sources ==
- Williamson, Elizabeth; Hudson, Tim; Musson, Jeremy; Nairn, Ian (2019) [1965]. Sussex: West. The Buildings of England. New Haven and London: Yale University Press. ISBN 978-0-300-22521-1. OCLC 1104943526.
