= Marcha de Tres Árboles =

English: Three Tree March
- Flag of the National Party from 1897 to 1904
- Lyrics: Julio Casas Araujo
- Music: Gerardo Metallo

The "Marcha de los Tres Árboles" (English: "Three Tree March") is a Uruguayan military march that commemorates the victory of the nationalist forces at the Battle of Tres Árboles against government troops on the banks of the Tres Árboles Creek, Río Negro Department, during the Revolution of 1897. It is the official anthem and song of the Uruguay National Party.

== History ==
The Marcha de los Tres Árboles was composed by the Italian-Uruguayan composer and conductor Gerardo Metallo, who recorded it as "Gran Marcha Militar Opus 35 for piano". The piece commemorates the victory of the National Party revolutionary troops led by Colonel Diego Lamas over the troops of the Colorado government of Juan Idiarte Borda at the Battle of Tres Árboles on March 17, during the 1897 Revolution. The uprising had arisen after the Colorado Party-led governments failed to comply with the power-sharing agreement of 1872—which had established a regime of co-participation and representation of both groups— and due to alleged fraud in the 1896 elections.

In the late 1940s, the Horonable Board, the National Party's central body, commissioned the poet Julio Casa Araújo to write the lyrics after which it became the anthem of the National Party. Since then, it is played at campaign rallies and party events, such as the anniversary of its founding on August 10 and the return of Wilson Ferreira Aldunate from exile on June 16.

== Lyrics ==
Marcha de Tres Árboles

Las muchedumbres iluminadas
por las antorchas de su fé
y el sacro fuego de su ideal
alzan al cielo, con arrogancia
la voz gloriosa del Partido Nacional.

Son nuestras banderas
metas del honor,
en la escuela y en los campos,
y el taller,
se forjaron las legiones
del deber,
y orgullosas van, soberbias en su afán,
augurando la victoria del Partido Nacional.

Nuestro canto es canción de libertad
bajo el dril de las blusas del taller,
y embandera las glorias del solaz
en los surcos dorados por la mies.

Nuestro canto es canción de libertad
que engrandece el clarín de la altivez,
justiciera promesa de igualdad
ante el fuego sagrado de la Ley.

Blanco pendón, emblema de la paz,
bandera altiva de fraternidad,
rumbo al honor, de la multitud,
brújula ardiente de la juventud.

Juventud radiante del Partido Nacional,
Todo por la Patria, pensamiento y sangre de ideal.
Firmes en la lucha: ¡Vivir es combatir!,
con la fiereza de vencer
y en el anhelo de imponer
nuestra divisa al porvenir

Las muchedumbres iluminadas
por las antorchas de su fé
y el sacro fuego de su ideal
alzan al cielo, con arrogancia
la voz gloriosa del Partido Nacional.

Three Tree March

The crowds, illuminated
by the torches of their faith
and the sacred fire of their ideal
arrogantly raise to heaven
the glorious voice of the National Party.

Our flags
are goals of honor,
in the school and in the fields,
and in the workshop,
the legions
of duty were forged,
and they go proudly, haughty in their eagerness,
announcing the victory of the National Party.

Our song is a song of freedom
under the denim of the blouses of the workshop,
and it carries the glories of solace
in the furrows gilded by the harvest.

Our song is a song of freedom
that magnifies the trumpet of pride,
just promise of equality
before the sacred fire of the Law.

White banner, emblem of peace,
high flag of fraternity,
heading to honor, of the multitude,
burning compass of youth.

Radiant youth of the National Party,
All for the Fatherland, thought and blood of ideal.
Firm in the fight: To live is to fight!,
with the ferocity to win
and in the desire to impose
our motto on the future

The crowds illuminated
by the torches of their faith
and the sacred fire of their ideal
arrogantly raise to heaven
the glorious voice of the National Party.
