= Lied der Partei =

Anthem of the SED

The "Lied der Partei" ('Song of the Party'), also known as "Die Partei hat immer recht" ('The Party is always right'), is the party song formerly used by the Socialist Unity Party of Germany (SED), the ruling party of East Germany. It was written by German Bohemian composer Louis Fürnberg, who as a devout communist joined the Communist Party of Czechoslovakia in 1928. It is best known by the first line of its chorus: Die Partei, die Partei, die hat immer recht ('The Party, the Party, is always right'). It was written in the early 1950s before Louis Fürnberg's death in 1957.

== History ==
The lyrics and music were written in 1949 (and premiered in 1950) by the German-Bohemian Louis Fürnberg, who had joined the Communist Party of Czechoslovakia in 1928. Although the song became popular as a hymn of praise, especially in East Germany, the specific reason for the song was of the opposite nature. Fürnberg, who was in Prague at the time, was denied invitation to the Ninth Party Congress of the Communist Party of Czechoslovakia in 1949 for the first time because he was considered a German speaker, a move that deeply offended him. As his widow, Lotte Fürnberg, explained in 2001, he wrote the song to bring himself back to order. "He wrote it to justify the insult to himself."

The personality cult of Josef Stalin is expressed in the latter half of the song's chorus. In critical view of Stalin's reign, the text was changed after the 20th Congress of the CPSU in February 1956. In the 22nd Congress of the CPSU, it was decided that Stalin was no longer part of Marxism–Leninism, and thus the state ideology of East Germany, in November 1961. Thus, the name Stalin was completely removed by 1964. By the Honecker era at the latest, the saying "The party is always right" had become a household name in the GDR.

A variation on the anthem has been used by the satirical German party Die PARTEI since its founding in 2004.

== See also ==
- East German Cold War Propaganda
