= Fight for Right Movement =

Former British patriotic movement

The Fight for Right Movement was founded in August 1915 by Francis Younghusband. Its aim was to increase support for the First World War in Great Britain and to boost morale in the armed forces.

== History ==
Membership cost five shillings and members were pledged to 'fight for right till right be won', a call against disaffection in the progress and conduct of the war. The movement also advocated thrift in wartime.

An early meeting of the movement took place at the Aeolian Hall concert venue in London and musical composition and performance played an important part in the group's work. Edward Elgar composed "Fight for Right" for the group, to a text by William Morris, while Hubert Parry turned to William Blake and composed "Jerusalem" for the movement, with both first performed on 21 March 1916 at a rally at Queen's Hall.

Many of the leading members of the movement were connected with Britain's War Propaganda Bureau, known as Wellington House.

Some early members such as Parry later became disaffected and the movement did not survive the war.

== List of early supporters ==
- James Bryce, 1st Viscount Bryce, President
- Thomas Hardy, Vice President
- Edward Elgar, Vice President
- Hubert Parry, Vice President
- Robert Bridges, Vice President
- James Lowther, 1st Viscount Ullswater, Vice President
- Gilbert Murray, Vice President
- George Walter Prothero, Vice President
- Millicent Fawcett
- Caroline Spurgeon
- Sir Frederick Pollock, 3rd Baronet, Chairman of Executive Committee
- Gervase Elwes
- Philip Kerr, 11th Marquess of Lothian
- Evelyn Underhill
- Henry Newbolt
- Maurice Hewlett
- L. P. Jacks
- Frederick Whyte
- Wickham Steed
- Émile Cammaerts
- Paul Painlevé
- Rev. William Temple
