= Glee Club (UK politics) =

Traditional event in Britain involving the Liberal Party

The Glee Club is a traditional event at the twice-per-year Liberal Democrat Conference and its predecessor, the Liberal Assembly, consisting of attendees singing while inebriated. It is a popular event in British politics and was a formative event in the lives of many British political leaders, including the former leader of the Labour Party, Michael Foot, amongst them. Foot described its opening song, "The Land", as the best political song he had come across, imbued with the democratic spirit, and designed to put fear in the hearts of the landlords.

Although the Glee Club has informally existed for many years, in 1967 the first songbook (entitled After the Count Was Over) was published by the National League of Young Liberals. Songbooks have been produced since the 1975 by Liberator. The 34th edition of the Liberator Songbook was published in 2026; it was the 41st songbook in its publishing history.

It is often combined with the Liberal Revue, a series of sketches consisting mostly of in-jokes and irreverent takes on political matters.

== See also ==
- Glee club
- Liberalism
