= Fight for Right =

Song by Edward Elgar

Edward Elgar in 1917

"Fight for Right" is a song written by the English composer Edward Elgar, with words taken from the epic poem The Story of Sigurd the Volsung and the Fall of the Niblungs by William Morris.

The song had been suggested to Elgar by the English tenor Gervase Elwes and was dedicated to Members of the Fight for Right Movement. Its premiere performance was as one of the musical items at a mass meeting of Fight for Right on 21 March 1916 at Queens Hall, London, when the soloist was Gervase Elwes. It was published by Elkin in 1916.

There are nine introductory bars of music, followed by the first four lines of the poem sung Quasi recit. ad lib. The next two lines are accompanied a tempo, then repeated as a chorus.

== Lyrics ==
FIGHT FOR RIGHT

Quasi recit. ad lib.

When thou hearest the fool rejoicing, and he saith, 'It is over and past,
And the wrong was better than right, and hate turns into love at the last,
And we strove for nothing at all, and the Gods are fallen asleep;
For so good is the world a-growing that the evil good shall reap:'

a tempo

Then loosen thy sword in the scabbard and settle the helm on thine head,
For men betrayèd are mighty, and great are the wrongfully dead.

Chorus

Then loosen thy sword in the scabbard and settle the helm on thine head,
For men betrayèd are mighty, and great are the wrongfully dead.

== Recordings ==
- "The Unknown Elgar" includes "Fight for Right" performed by Stephen Holloway (bass), with Barry Collett (piano)
