= The Red Flag =

Socialist song

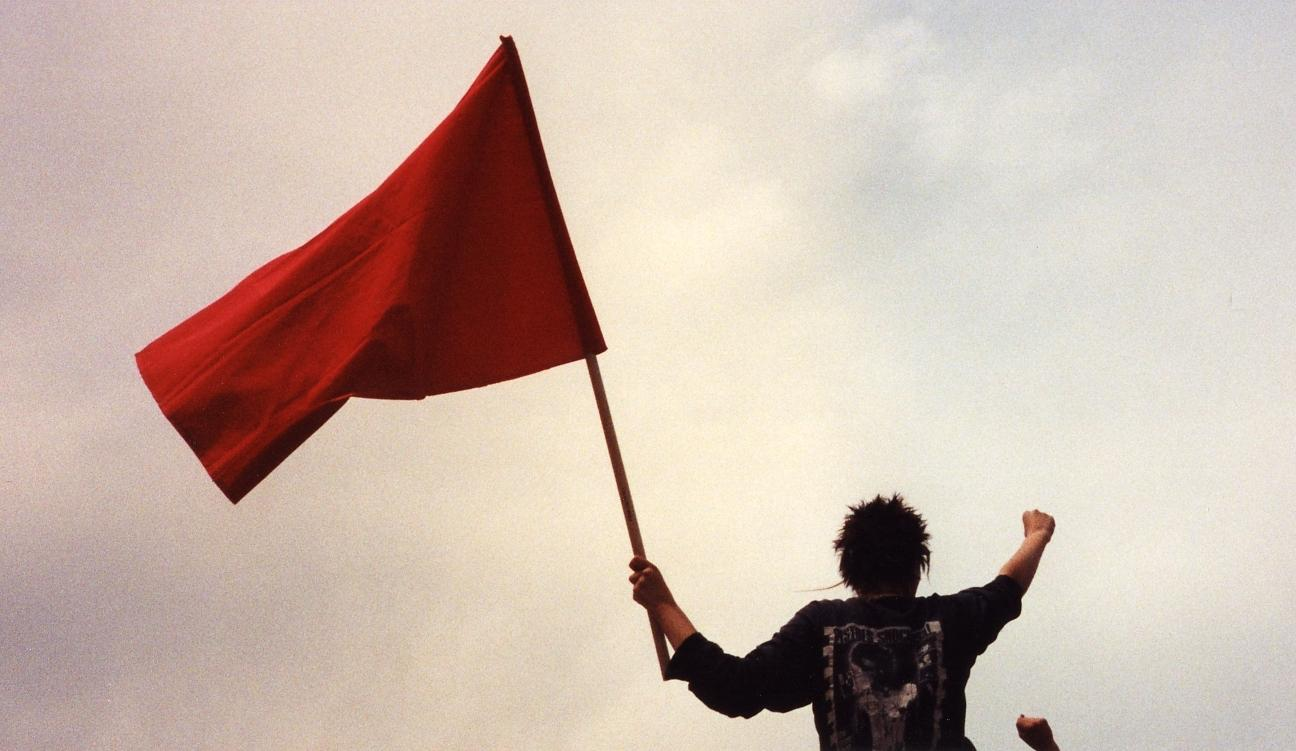
- A red flag being waved on International Workers' Day in Madrid
- Party anthem of Labour Party (UK), Social Democratic and Labour Party (Northern Ireland) and Labour Party (Ireland)
- Lyrics: Jim Connell, 1889
- Music: Lauriger Horatius

Audio sample
- The Red Flag sung in 1926: file; help

"The Red Flag" (Roud V45381) is a socialist song, emphasising the sacrifices and solidarity of the international labour movement. It is the anthem of the British Labour Party, the Northern Irish Social Democratic and Labour Party, and the Irish Labour Party. It was used by the New Zealand Labour Party until the late 1940s. The song is traditionally sung at the close of each party's national conference.

Translated versions of the song are sung by the Japanese Communist Party and Korean People's Army.

Some Chelsea, Oldham Athletic, and Sunderland supporters sing the song, albeit with altered lyrics, at their games.

== History ==
Irishman Jim Connell wrote the song's lyrics in 1889 in Nicholas Donovan's house. There are six stanzas, each followed by the chorus. It is normally sung to the tune of "Lauriger Horatius", better known as the German carol "O Tannenbaum" ("O Christmas Tree"), though Connell had wanted it sung to the tune of a pro-Jacobite Robert Burns anthem, "The White Cockade". The use of the tune of "O Tannenbaum" was popularised by British socialist writer Adolphe Smith Headingley in the 1890s; Connell disapproved of the tune which he regarded as "church music" and conservative by nature.

When Billy Bragg recorded the song in 1990 with Scottish folk singer Dick Gaughan, he sang it to this original "White Cockade" melody. The lyrics of the first verse and the chorus, which are the most well-known parts of the song, are as follows:

The people's flag is deepest red,
It shrouded oft our martyred dead
And ere their limbs grew stiff and cold,
Their hearts' blood dyed its every fold.

So raise the scarlet standard high,
Beneath its shade we'll live and die,
Though cowards flinch and traitors sneer,
We'll keep the red flag flying here.

"The Red Flag" resonated with the early radical workers' movement in the United States, and it appeared as the first song in the first edition of the Little Red Songbook of the Industrial Workers of the World in 1909. Only five of the six stanzas were printed, omitting the fourth stanza that begins, "It well recalls the triumphs past." In a 1913 article for the Industrial Worker, the celebrated IWW bard Joe Hill rejected the category of "the people" as middle class, and suggested a further change to the song. Referring to his experiences in the Magonista rebellion of 1911, he wrote:

When the Red Flag was flying in Lower California there were not any of "the people" in the ranks of the rebels. Common working stiffs and cow-punchers were in the majority, with a little sprinkling of "outlaws," whatever that is. [...] Well, it is about time that every rebel wakes up to the fact that "the people" and the workingclass [sic] have nothing in common. Let us sing after this "The Workers' flag is deepest red" and to hell with "the people."

The song spread throughout the globe spurred on by the Workers Movement and their quest for a better life, reaching many a remote country. For example, "The Red Flag” was played by the Runanga Band at the conclusion of a burial service for Henry John Morris (AKA Harry, born Henry John Vaughan, 1880-1920) in Greymouth, New Zealand on 11 January 1920. Henry had left Wales for New Zealand in 1908, in part to work in Government Mines far removed from the rugged employment conditions of family-owned mines in Wales. Henry became locally prominent in the Socialist and Labour Movement, as he had been at home in Wales, which is reflected in his last wish for "The Red Flag” to be played at his burial.

In 1982 two very different versions of the song were issued, Shakin Stevens recorded a rock & roll cover of the song known as "Red Flag Rock", while ex-Soft Machine singer and drummer Robert Wyatt included a version on his collection of socialist and resistance songs "Nothing Can Stop Us".

=== Use by the British Labour Party ===
"The Red Flag" has been the British Labour Party's official anthem from its founding; its annual party conference closes with the song, along with Jerusalem. "The Red Flag" was first sung in the House of Commons on 1 August 1945, when Parliament convened after the defeat of Winston Churchill's Conservatives by the Labour Party led by Clement Attlee. Dockers in London were regarded as militant socialists ever since their strike in 1889 for the "dockers' tanner." In the 1950s, at the end of public meetings with management, dockers filling the main floor of the hall sang "The Red Flag" while superintendents and managers (usually segregated in the gallery) simultaneously sang "God Save the Queen". "The Red Flag" was sung by Welsh Labour MPs on 27 May 1976, allegedly prompting Michael Heseltine to swing the parliamentary mace above his head.

It was also sung on the evening of 28 March 1979 when a motion of no confidence brought down the Labour government. It was sung again in Parliament in February 2006 to mark the centenary of the Labour Party's founding. It was sung in the House of Commons once more in September 2019 in protest at the prorogation of parliament.

During the Tony Blair government it was claimed the leadership sought to downplay the use of the song. Following the 2015 election of veteran socialist Jeremy Corbyn as Leader of the Labour Party and Leader of the Opposition, "The Red Flag" was sung as he and his supporters celebrated in The Sanctuary, a public house in London.

== Lyrics ==
The People's Flag is deepest red,
It shrouded oft our martyred dead,
And ere their limbs grew stiff and cold,
Their hearts' blood dyed its every fold.

Chorus:
Then raise the scarlet standard high.
Beneath its shade we'll live and die,
Though cowards flinch and traitors sneer,
We'll keep the red flag flying here.

Look round, the Frenchman loves its blaze,
The sturdy German chants its praise,
In Moscow's vaults its hymns were sung
Chicago swells the surging throng.

(chorus)

It waved above our infant might,
When all ahead seemed dark as night;
It witnessed many a deed and vow,
We must not change its colour now.

(chorus)

It well recalls the triumphs past,
It gives the hope of peace at last;
The banner bright, the symbol plain,
Of human right and human gain.

(chorus)

It suits today the weak and base,
Whose minds are fixed on pelf and place
To cringe before the rich man's frown,
And haul the sacred emblem down.

(chorus)

With head uncovered swear we all
To bear it onward till we fall;
Come dungeons dark or gallows grim,
This song shall be our parting hymn.

(chorus)

== Alternative versions ==
Bandiera Rossa
Bandiera Rossa performed by Corale Verdi Milano between 1900 and 1959

A famous song of the Italian labour movement has the same title (though in Italian): "Bandiera Rossa", but different lyrics and tune, as does the French song "Le drapeau rouge", known in English as "The Standard of Revolt".

The melody is used in Harold Baum's "The Michaelis Anthem" in The Biochemists' Songbook.

=== Parodies ===
"The Red Flag" was parodied by singer-songwriter Leon Rosselson as the "Battle Hymn of the New Socialist Party," also known as "The Red Flag Once a Year" or "The People's Flag Is Palest Pink." It is intended to satirise the perceived lack of socialist principles in the Labour Party. The initial parody was widely known in the 1960s, sometimes sung during late night parties at student conferences. It was revived in the early 2000s in response to the centrist reforms associated with Tony Blair. A version which began "The people's flag is palest pink, mum washed it in the kitchen sink" was popular among schoolchildren in the 1950s, which may have inspired Rosselson's version. A version can be found as far back as 1920 in "Through Bolshevik Russia" by Ethel Snowden.

A version of the lyrics sung regularly at the Liberal Democrats' Glee Club, also dated to the mid-1960s, is:

The people's flag is palest pink,
It's not as red as most folk think.
We must not let the people know
What socialists thought long ago.
Don't let the scarlet banner float;
We want the middle classes' vote.
Let our old fashioned comrades sneer,
We'll stay in power for many a year.

The anarcho-syndicalist punk band Chumbawamba's "Rubens has been Shot" parodied the song which conflated "The Red Flag" and "Oh Christmastree", which share a common tune, to suggest the corruption or wilting of the Labour movement's original values:

Oh Christmas tree, oh Christmas tree
How bent your branches seem to be
Nineteen twenty-one and all's well
Another fifteen years and we'll be laughing in hell
One bullet straight through the heart
Rubens caught a ricochet, Durer's lady cried today
Cracked old masters up against the wall
Blue-faced Wendy Woolworth--she's seen it all
Housepainter, housepainter
Hanging your swastika wallpaper
Rows of pretty cabbageheads to gobble up your words
Laughing along to your blah, blah, blah

A parody of unknown origin is known as "The Foreman's Job", and this is sometimes considered a rugby song. This has many variants but usually begins:

The working class can kiss my arse
I got the foreman's job at last.
You can tell old Joe I'm off the dole
He can stick his Red Flag up his 'ole!

=== Football chants ===
A version of "The Red Flag" with similar lyrics entitled "We'll Never Die" is the official anthem of Manchester United F.C.:

We’ll never die, we’ll never die
We’ll never die, we’ll never die
We’ll keep the red flag flying high
'Cos Man United never die

A similar football chant is also sung regularly by supporters of Sunderland AFC:

Flying high up in the sky,
We'll keep the red flag flying high,
Wherever you go you're sure to know,
We'll keep the red flag flying high.

Supporters of Bristol City F.C. (also known as ciderheads) sing the same version with a third line of "Ciderheads until we die". AFC Bournemouth fans sing the third line as "Dean Court to Wembley", and Wrexham A.F.C. supporters end with:

On the road to victory,
We'll keep the Welsh flag flying high.

Chelsea F.C. fans sing a version of the song called "The Blue Flag":

From Stamford Bridge to Wembley
We'll keep the blue flag flying high
Flying high up in the sky
We'll keep the Blue flag flying high
From Stamford Bridge to Wembley
We'll keep the blue flag flying high

Oldham Athletic also fans sing a version of the song called “The Blue Flag”:

Flying high up in the sky
We’ll keep the blue flag flying high
We’ll face to foe wherever we go
We’ll keep the blue flag flying high

Northampton Town F.C. supporters have their own adaptation "The Fields Are Green":

The fields are green, the sky is blue
The River Nene goes winding through
The Market Square is cobblestoned
It shakes the old dears to the bones
No finer town you'll ever see
No finer town there'll ever be
Big city lights don't bother me
Northampton Town, I'm proud to be!

Leeds United fans sing a version of the song called "Forever and Ever":

Forever and ever
We'll follow our team
We're Leeds United, we rule supreme
We'll never be mastered, by you,
By you fucking bastards
We'll keep the white flag flying high

Supporters of Wolverhampton Wanderers sing a version of the song called "The Gold Flag"

We’ll never die, we’ll never die
We’ll never die, we’ll never die
We're Wanderers, we'll never die
We'll keep the gold flag flying high

=== The Net Flag ===
A version of "The Red Flag" with similar lyrics entitled "The Net Flag" was introduced near the inception of the World Wide Web:

The people's web is deepest red,
And oft it's killed our routers dead.
But ere the bugs grew ten days old,
The patches fixed the broken code.
So raise the open standard high
Within its codes we'll live or die
Though cowards flinch and Bill Gates sneers
We'll keep the net flag flying here.

== In popular culture ==
The final scene of Who Dares Wins / The Final Option (US) ends with an orchestral version of 'The Red Flag". "Later, in a government building, politician Sir Richard complains to a colleague about the violent end to the siege. He then meets with Malek and they discuss future similar actions. Over the credits, a list of terrorist incidents is displayed, accompanied by a rendition of The Red Flag".

The 2001 Hong Kong film Running Out of Time 2 ends with "The Red Flag" at a Christmas party, when it is revealed that the magician-thief made charitable donations to African children.

"The Red Flag" is sung in the 2018 film Red Joan at a Cambridge University socialist meeting circa 1938 attended by the young protagonist (portrayed by Sophie Cookson) and her romantic interest Leo (portrayed by Tom Hughes).

The tune also appears in the title sequence of popular 1970’s UK sitcom Citizen Smith, which is about a Marxist revolutionary living in Tooting, London.

In Season 5, Episode 7 of 'Allo 'Allo!, the song is sung by members of the Communist Resistance as the bride is led down the aisle.

Episode 3, in season 4 of the TV show The Boys (TV series) is titled "We'll Keep The Red Flag Flying Here", a reference to the final lyric of the chorus of "The Red Flag".

== Recordings ==
- Billy Bragg
- Dick Gaughan

== See also ==
- List of socialist songs
- The Land
