= Felpham =

Village and parish in West Sussex, England

Coordinates: 50.79046°N 0.65394°W

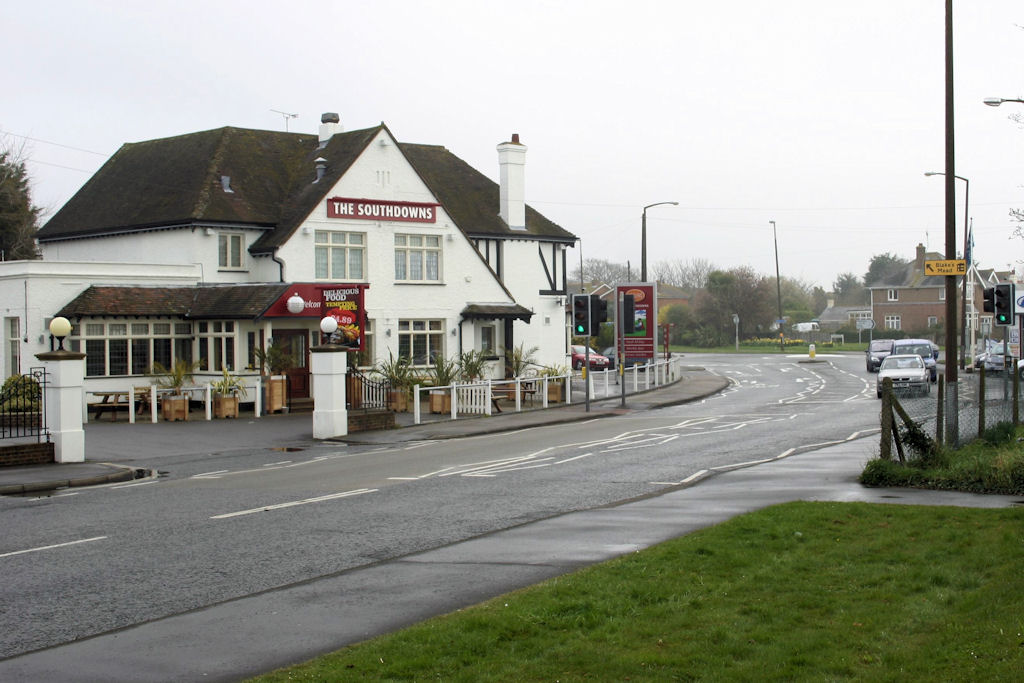
- The B2259/B2132 junction

- Location within West Sussex
- Area: 4.26 km^{2} (1.64 sq mi)
- Population: 9,746 (2011)
  - Density: 2,255/km^{2} (5,840/sq mi)
- OS grid reference: SZ949998
  - London: 54 miles (87 km) NNE
- Civil parish: Felpham
- District: Arun
- Shire county: West Sussex
- Region: South East
- Country: England
- Sovereign state: United Kingdom
- Post town: BOGNOR REGIS
- Postcode district: PO22
- Dialling code: 01243
- Police: Sussex
- Fire: West Sussex
- Ambulance: South East Coast
- UK Parliament: Bognor Regis and Littlehampton
- Website: http://www.felphampc.gov.uk/

Felpham (/ˈfɛlpəm/, FEL-Fum, locally /-fəm/ or /-θəm/, thəm) is a village and civil parish in the Arun District of West Sussex, England. Although sometimes considered part of the urban area of greater Bognor Regis, it is a village and civil parish in its own right, having an area of 1.645 square miles, (4.26 km),^{2} with a population of 9,611 people that is still growing (2001 census). The population at the 2011 Census was 9,746. As of 2026, there is an on-going consultation process concerning the local government arrangement for West Sussex, with one possibility being the creation of a unitary authority. The consultation decision in due in 2027, with elections in 2028.

Felpham lies on the B2259 coastal road.

The 12th century Anglican parish church is dedicated to the Virgin Mary. There is also a Methodist church close to the three-way junction of Felpham Way, Flansham Lane and Middleton Road, in the east of the village.

== History ==
Felpham is mentioned in a charter of 953 by which King Eadred granted thirty hides of land there to his mother Queen Eadgifu. It was mentioned in the Domesday Book of the 11th century, under the hundred of Binstead: "St Edward's Abbey [Shaftesbury] holds and held Felpham before 1066..." Its value before 1066 was said to be £10.

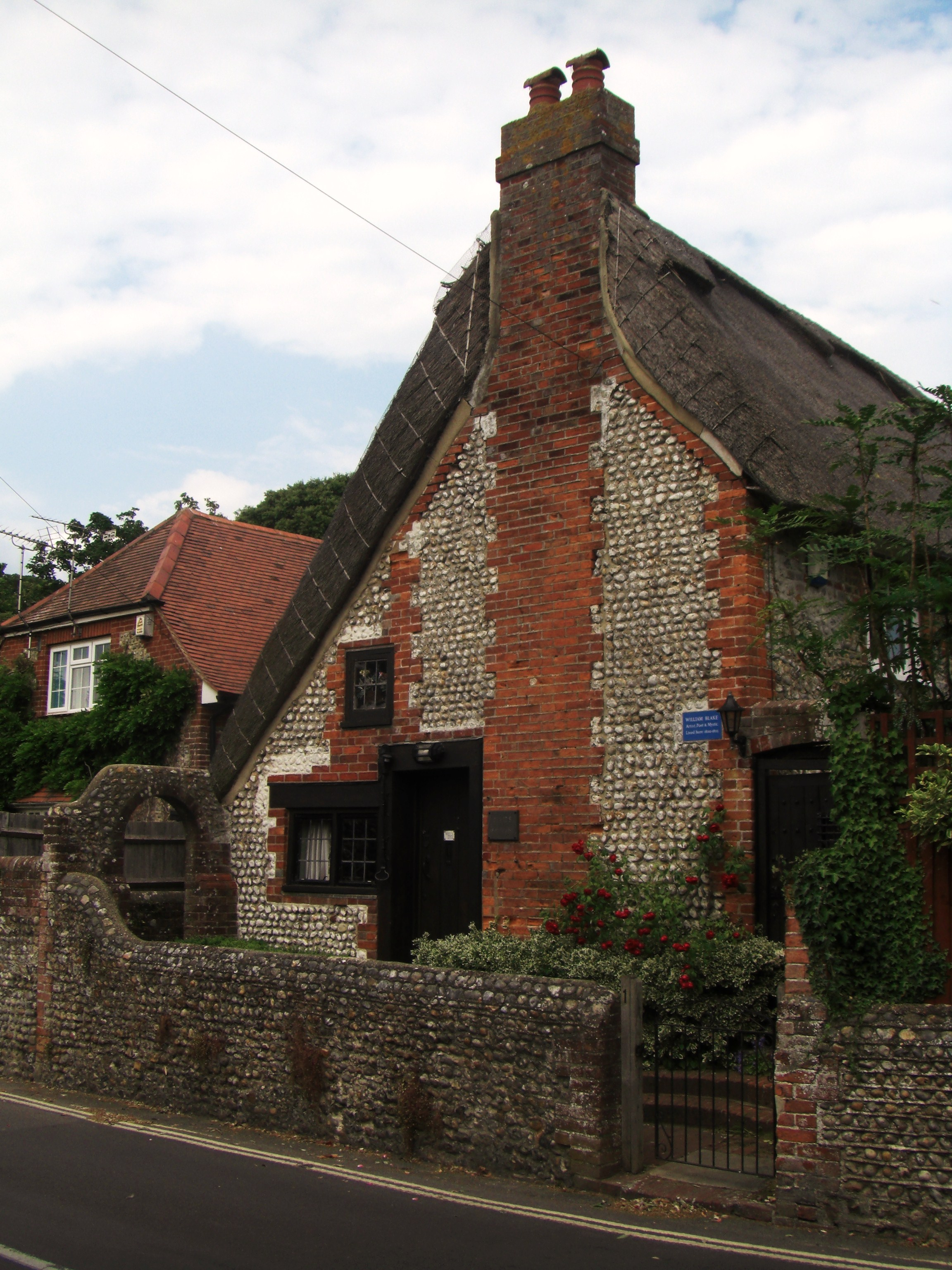
Blake’s Cottage in Felpham where William Blake lived from 1800 till 1803.

The poet William Blake was introduced to the village by his friend William Hayley and lived in Felpham for three years between 1800 and 1803. He wrote Milton: A Poem in Two Books, while living in a house now named Blake’s Cottage. The poem contains the line about "England's green and pleasant land", today known as the anthem "Jerusalem", which were inspired by Blake's "evident pleasure" in the Felpham countryside. The cottage where he lived is depicted in the illustrations for the poem. It lies within the original village, close to the Fox public house. Of the village he wrote:

Away to sweet Felpham for heaven is there:
The Ladder of Angels descends through the air
On the turrett its spiral does softly descend
Through the village it winds, at my cot it does end.

The "turrett" in the verse is Hayley's house, east of the church, which he built around 1800. It was in Felpham that Blake had his altercation with the drunken soldier John Scofield, who was trespassing in his garden. This led to Blake's trial for sedition because of Scofield's allegation that he had cursed the king. Blake has a road named after him, Blake's Road, the road on which his former residence is sited, and a memorial window dedicated to him in St Mary's Church.

Blake's host, Hayley, was also famous in his day for having turned down the offer of the position of poet laureate in 1790.

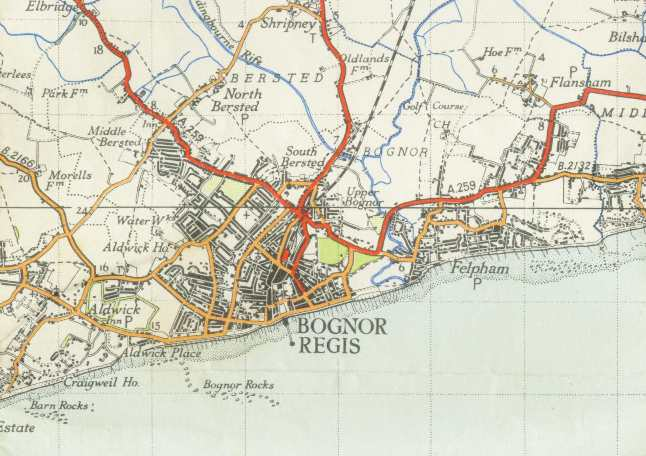
A 1947 Ordnance Survey map, showing Bognor Regis with Felpham to the right

The village has a village hall, called the Memorial Hall, built in remembrance to the fallen from the First World War and a church community hall called St Mary's Centre.

Due to the 1960s redevelopment, Peartree Cottage in Vicarage Lane is now the oldest house in Felpham. It is a late medieval (c. 1500), four bay, timber-framed thatched Yeoman's house with queen struts and clasped side purlins. It had an open first bay, (probably a workshop) and still has an intact smoke bay. In the 1700s the house was 'modernised' with the insertion of a chimney built within the smoke bay and three exterior walls replaced with flint with rubble infill. Peartree has a small Victorian extension faced with galleted knapped flint. Two small bays were added to the south face of the house in the early 1900s.

In the 1940s the house was owned by the Jagger family, namely David Jagger (1891–1958). He and his siblings, Edith Jagger (1880–1977) and Charles Sargeant Jagger (1885–1934) were all celebrated artists.

Great expansion of the village took place between 1930 and 1960 when three (nominally) gated housing estates were developed, and again in the 1970s when two public housing developments took place on farmland between Felpham and its neighbouring village of Middleton-on-Sea. In December 2006 planning permission was granted for further development, this time on farmland to the north between felpham and flansham and was finished in early 2019.

== Local facilities ==
Felpham has two primary schools, Bishop Tufnell CE School (A Church of England Aided School) and Downview Primary (Infant and Junior) School.

Felpham Community College, the main school in the area, operates its own youth wing. It is situated next door to the Arun Leisure Centre which has extensive playing fields. FCC (As it is locally referred to as) also hosts a SEND block and a sixth form wing.

Felpham has a recreation ground, King George's Field, named after King George V.

== Sport and leisure ==
Felpham Colts Football Club (including mixed teams, boys' teams and girls' teams) is the largest youth football club in West Sussex. It has 26 teams competing in local football leagues and has been in existence since 1973. In the early 2010s a men's team was started and went on to win a number of promotions, currently playing in the West Sussex Football League Division Two South. Their home ground is the King George V Playing Field.

Predators Youth started in 1994 and has grown to 14 youth teams, a women's team and an adults team.

The Felpham & Middleton Country Dance Club is one of the oldest extant English country dance clubs in England.

== Felpham beach ==
Much like its neighbour to the west Felpham also hosts a seaside. The beachfront features:

- The local sailing club, founded in 1955
- Rentable beach huts
- Several restaurants
- The Beachcroft Hotel

== Notable people ==
- Edward James Salisbury (1886–1978), botanist and ecologist, died in Felpham
