= Milton: A Poem in Two Books =

Epic poem by William Blake

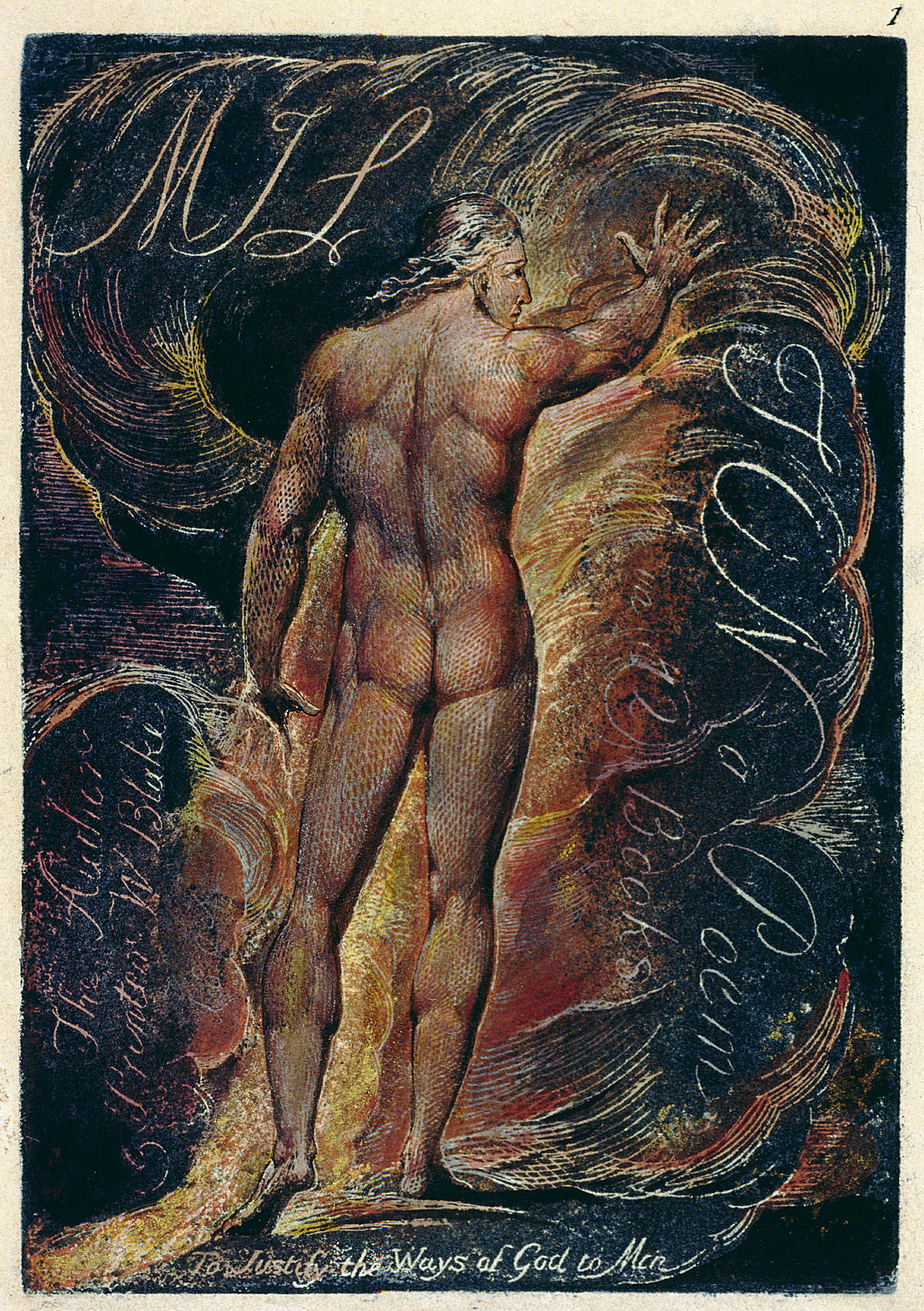
Frontispiece to Milton. Milton's intention to "justify the ways of God to men" (from Paradise Lost) appears beneath his depiction by Blake.

Milton: A Poem in Two Books is an epic poem by William Blake, written and illustrated between 1804 and 1810. Its hero is John Milton, who returns from Heaven and unites with the author to explore the relationship between living writers and their predecessors, and to undergo a mystical journey to correct his own spiritual errors.

Blake's Milton was printed in his characteristic combination of etched text and illustration supplemented by watercolour.

== Preface ==
The preface to Milton includes the poem "And did those feet in ancient time", which was set to music as the hymn called "Jerusalem". The poem appears after a prose attack on the influence of Greek and Roman culture, which is unfavourably contrasted with "the Sublime of the Bible".

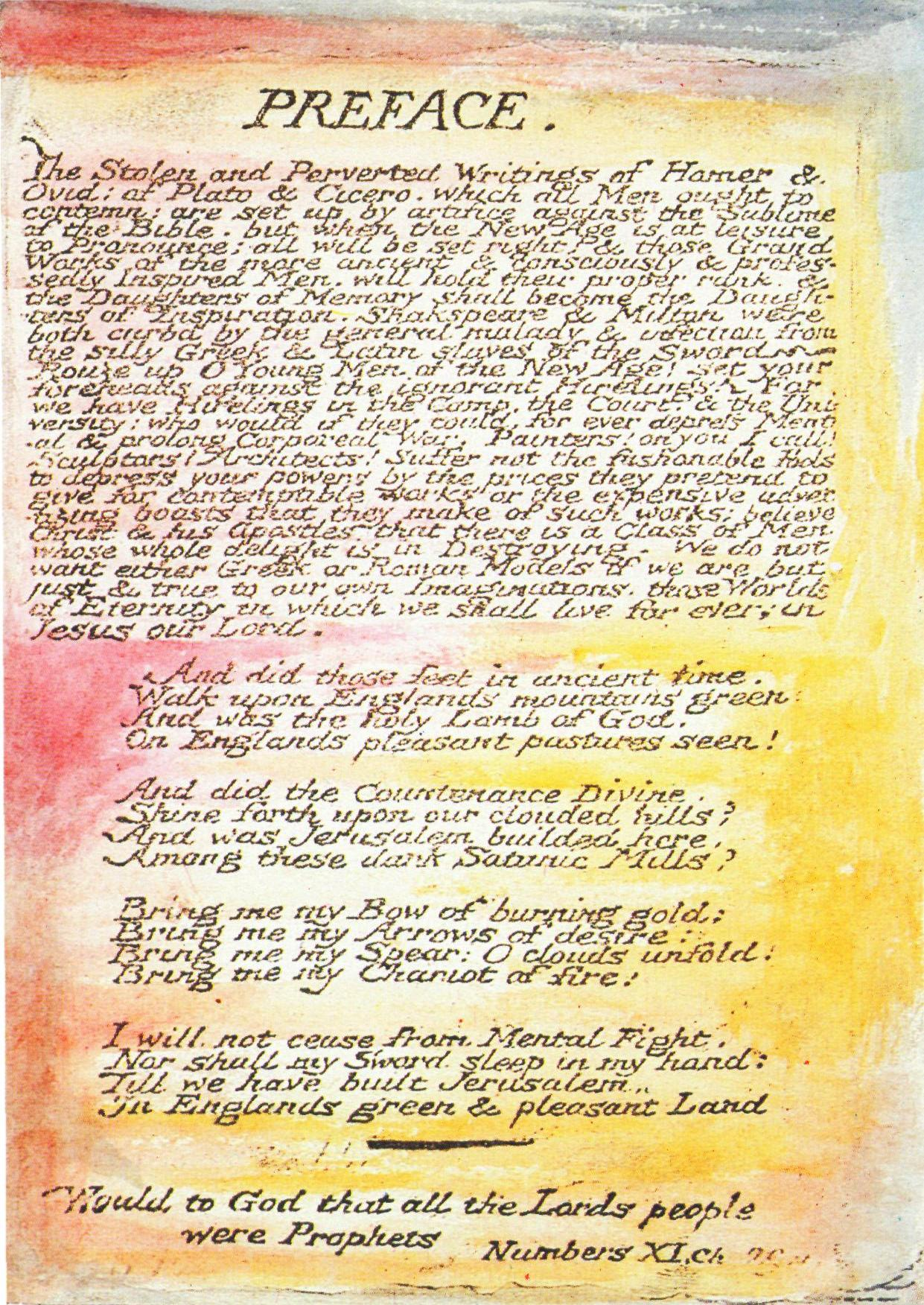
The preface to Milton, as it appeared in Blake's own illuminated version

== Text ==
The poem is divided into two "books".

Book I opens with an epic invocation to the muses, drawing on the classical models of Homer and Virgil, which were also used by John Milton in Paradise Lost. However, Blake describes inspiration in bodily terms, vitalising the nerves of his arm. Blake goes on to describe the activities of Los, one of his mythological characters, who creates a complex universe from within which other Blakean characters debate the actions of Satan. As with all of Blake's Prophecies, the general structure of the Poem begins with the Fall and ends with the Apocalypse or consummation. The fall is pictured vividly as each of the five senses plummets into an abyss; each "broods" there in fear and desperation. These represent an early fallen Age in Blake's Mythological construct.

The early pages are dominated by a "Bard's Prophetic Song", heard in Heaven by the "unfallen" Milton. The relationship The Bard's Song has with the rest of the text is in dispute, and the meaning of it is complex. Referring to the doctrines of Calvinism, Blake's "Bard" asserts that humanity is divided into the "Elect", the "Reprobate" and the "Redeemed". Inverting Calvinist values, Blake insists that the "Reprobate" are the true believers, while the "Elect" are locked in narcissistic moralism. At this point Milton, hearing the Bard's song, appears and agrees to return to earth to purge the errors of his own Puritan imposture and go to "Eternal death".

Milton travels to Lambeth, taking in the form of a falling comet, and enters Blake's foot, the foot here representing the point of contact between the human body and the exterior "vegetative world". Thus the ordinary world as perceived by the five senses is a sandal formed of "precious stones and gold" that he can now wear. Blake ties the sandal and, guided by Los, walks with it into the City of Art, inspired by the spirit of poetic creativity.

Book II finds Blake in the garden of his cottage, now Blake’s Cottage, in the village of Felpham. Ololon, a female figure linked to Milton, descends to meet him. Blake sees a skylark, which mutates into a twelve-year-old girl, who he thinks is one of his own muses. He invites her into his cottage to meet his wife. The girl states that she is actually looking for Milton. Milton then descends to meet with her, and in an apocalyptic scene he is eventually unified with the girl, who is identified as Ololon and becomes his own feminine aspect.

The poem concludes with a vision of a final union of living and dead, internal and external reality, and male and female, and a transformation of all of human perception.

Ololon: Blake studied Hebrew. He incorporated Hebrew twice in Milton and coined the name "Ololon" out of a Hebrew word.

== Book and chapter length commentary ==
The following books, chapters, and other works, are commentaries and critiques pertaining to this poem:

=== Book ===
- Bracher, Mark (1985). Being Form'd: Thinking Through Blake's "Milton" (1st ed.). Station Hill Press. ISBN 0882680137.
- Eaves, Morris (2006). Eaves, Morris (ed.). The Cambridge Companion to William Blake. Cambridge Companions to Literature and Classics. Cambridge University Press. doi:10.1017/CCOL0521781477. ISBN 9780511999130.
- Esterhammer, Angela (2005). Esterhammer, Angela (ed.). Northrop Frye on Milton and Blake. Collected Works of Northrop Frye. Vol. 16. University of Toronto Press. doi:10.3138/9781442677821. ISBN 9781442677821. JSTOR 10.3138/9781442677821.
- Fox, Susan (1976). Poetic Form in Blake's 'Milton'. Princeton Legacy Library. Princeton University Press. ISBN 9780691644240. JSTOR j.ctt13x0wnz. (reprinted 2016)
- Freed, Eugenie (1994). "A Portion of His Life" William Blake's Miltonic Vision of Woman. Lewisburg PA: Bucknell University Press. London: Associated University Presses. ISBN 0838752659.
- Howard, John (1976). Blake's Milton: A Study in Selfhood. Fairleigh Dickinson University Press. ISBN 9780838617564. OCLC 902557431.
- James, David E. (1978). Written Within and Without: A Study of Blake's 'Milton'. Peter Lang. ISBN 9783261023612. OCLC 123201532.
- Shiff, Abraham Samuel (2019). William Blake's Hebrew in Milton and Ololon: Deciphering Blake's Hebrew Puns. Liongrass Editions. ISBN 978-1-7337090-0-2.

=== Chapter ===
- Frye, Northrop (1947). "10. Comus Agonistes". Fearful Symmetry: A Study of William Blake. Princeton University Press. pp. 314–325. JSTOR j.ctt2jc88p. Free PDF download.

=== Theses ===
- Withers, Stacie F. (1978) Blake's Milton: a critical introduction and a commentary. Masters thesis, Durham University. Free PDF download.
