= Tausend Sterne sind ein Dom =

German Christmas song

Song
- Released: 1946
- Genre: Christmas music
- Songwriter: Siegfried Köhler

"Tausend Sterne sind ein Dom" (Thousand stars form a cathedral) is a German Christmas song.

== History ==
The song was originally the sixth movement in a Christmas cantata of the same name for choir and instruments by German composer Siegfried Köhler. It was written after the end of World War II under the impression of the year 1946, in the aftermath of World War II. In this year, Köhler had been released from war captivity due to suffering from tuberculosis. His composition of three stanzas with emotive lyrics grew into one of the best-known Christmas songs of the German Democratic Republic.
