= Liberal Party (UK, 1989) =

The Liberal Party
- Leader: Steve Radford
- Chairman: Charles Shaw
- Founded: 1989; 37 years ago (Note: States as registered 25 February 1999)
- Split from: Social and Liberal Democrats
- Headquarters: 41 Sutton Street, Liverpool, Merseyside, United Kingdom, L13 7EG
- Newspaper: Liberal News
- Ideology: Liberalism (British)
- Political position: Centre
- Colours: Orange
- Slogan: Campaigning for a Liberal Society
- Local government: 7 / 19,481

Website
- www.liberal.org.uk

The Liberal Party is a minor political party in the United Kingdom which espouses liberalism. It was founded in 1989 by members of the original Liberal Party (founded in 1859) who opposed the latter's merger with the Social Democratic Party (SDP) to form the Liberal Democrats. The Liberal Party currently holds seven local council seats.

== History ==
The original Liberal Party entered into an alliance with the Social Democratic Party in 1981 and merged with it in 1988 to form what became the Liberal Democrats. The Liberal Party, founded in 1859, was descended from the Whigs, Radicals, Irish Independent Party and Peelites, while the SDP was a new party created in 1981 by former Labour members, MPs and cabinet ministers, but which also gained defections from Conservatives.

A small minority of the Liberal Party, notably including the former MP Michael Meadowcroft (the last elected president of the Liberal Party), resolved to continue with the Liberal Party. They continued using the old party name and symbols, including the party anthem, The Land. Meadowcroft announced this reformation after the defeat of the traditional liberal Alan Beith to become party leader of the Liberal Democrats, although Beith himself stayed with the latter.

The continuing Liberal Party included several councillors and council groups from the pre-1988 party which had never joined the merged party and continued as Liberals (hence the disputed foundation date), but no MPs. The number of Liberal district councillors gradually declined thereafter to a nadir of 5 in 2022; since 2022, the number of councillors has remained roughly stable in the mid-to-high single digits, and the party currently has 7 councillors. The party has had its greatest success in elections to Liverpool City Council, and it is currently led by Liverpool city councillor Steve Radford.

Meadowcroft stepped down from the party presidency in 2002, and was replaced by Radford. In 2007, Meadowcroft left the party and joined the Liberal Democrats. Radford stood down in 2009, and was replaced as president of the party by former councillor Rob Wheway, who served a year as leader. Radford was re-elected party president in 2010, and has been elected for further terms by members in ballot at assemblies and by electronic voting.

Party members take part in Liberal International (LI) activities through the Liberal International British Group.

=== Europe ===
The 1989 reformed party initially continued the Liberal Party's support for European integration but, unlike the Liberal Democrats, they came to oppose the Single European currency and the Maastricht Treaty, the latter of which was seen as disempowering the European Parliament. In the 1997 general election, they advocated turning the European Union into a "Commonwealth of Europe", which would include all European countries and focus on peace and the environment, rather than on economic issues. In Meadowcroft's book for this election, he advocated joining the Schengen agreement, an idea which did not appear in the party's manifesto. The Party in this period also opposed referendums with the line "It is dangerous to pretend that issues can be settled by a simple question with a yes or no answer", and instead preferred citizens' juries. After Radford replaced Meadowcroft as party leader, the Liberal Party became increasingly Eurosceptic.

The party put up a full slate of candidates in the North West England region for the 2004 European Parliament election, coming seventh with 4.6% of the vote (0.6% of the total British popular vote).

In the 2009 European Parliament election, the Liberal Party's Steve Radford participated in the No2EU electoral alliance.

In the 2016 United Kingdom European Union membership referendum campaign, the party let candidates express their own views, but both the National Executive and many party members supported Leave. As the party had a long-standing opposition to the use of referendums, they released a statement that ceding sovereignty was an exception to this principle, and that the Lisbon and Maastricht Treaties should have been subjected to referendums on transferring power to the European Union.

Following the referendum, the party argued that the country should leave the EU in its manifestos for the 2017 and 2019 general elections.

== Ideology ==
The Liberal Party refers to its ideology as a "hybrid" of classical liberalism and social liberalism, and claims that the Liberal Democrats have shown contempt for "liberal principles", the "British people" and the "democratic process".

== Electoral performance ==
Parliament of the United Kingdom
Election	Leader	Votes		Seats		Position (Note: Position is determined by parties who received the most to the least number of seats in parliament, then by most votes to least number of votes for parties that did not win a seat.)
Election	Leader	No.	%	No.	±	Position
1992	Michael Meadowcroft	64,744	0.2%	0 / 651	New	13th
1997	Michael Meadowcroft	45,166	0.1%	0 / 659	0	▼18th
2001	Michael Meadowcroft	13,685	0.1%	0 / 659	0	▼20th
2005	Michael Meadowcroft	19,068	0.1%	0 / 646	0	▼22nd
2010	Rob Wheway	6,781	<0.1%	0 / 650	0	▼29th
2015	Steve Radford	4,480	<0.1%	0 / 650	0	▲25th
2017	Steve Radford	3,672	<0.1%	0 / 650	0	▲24th
2019	Steve Radford	10,876	<0.1%	0 / 650	0	▲18th
2024	Steve Radford	6,375	<0.1%	0 / 650	0	▼30th

European Parliament
Election	Leaders	Votes		Seats		Position (Note: Position is determined by parties who received the most to the least number of seats in parliament, then by most votes to least number of votes for parties that did not win a seat.)
Election	Leaders	No.	%	No.	±	Position
1989	Michael Meadowcroft	Did not contest election				
1994	Michael Meadowcroft	100,500	0.6%	0 / 87	New	12th
1999	Michael Meadowcroft	93,051	0.9%	0 / 87	0	▼14th
2004	Michael Meadowcroft	96,325	0.6%	0 / 78	0	▲13th
2009		Did not contest election				
2014		Did not contest election				
2019	Steve Radford	Did not contest election				

In the 2011 local council elections, eight Liberal councillors held their seats, three lost their seats and five new Liberal councillors were elected: a net gain of two. In the two years leading to the May 2013 local elections, the number of Liberal councillors rose from 16 to 21.

Cllr Steve Radford received 4,442 (4.5%) of the votes in the first round of the Mayor of Liverpool 2012 election. In the 2012 United Kingdom local elections there was a net loss of six seats, in the 2013 elections the party won three seats, a gain of one.

Although the Liberal Party has retained councillors in Ryedale and Liverpool, it has not had a significant impact. However, Liberal member John Clark served as chair of Ryedale District Council's policy and resources committee, making him de facto leader of the council, from March 2021 until his death that August.

In 2014, the Liberal Party held 21 council seats at county and district level and 15 seats at community level. The party has no representation in the UK Parliament or Scottish Parliament, nor did it ever have Members of the European Parliament (MEPs). At the 2001 UK general election the party's best local result was coming second behind Labour in Liverpool West Derby, pushing the Liberal Democrats into third place. However, it was unable to repeat this at the 2005 general election; it finished third behind the Liberal Democrats in the constituency, still beating the Conservative Party, and repeated this position at the 2010 general election. In the 2015 general election the Liberal Party came fourth narrowly holding its deposit, ahead of the Liberal Democrats (who came last) and the Green Party, but behind UKIP and the Conservative Party.

At the 2017 general election, the party contested four seats and received 3,672 votes.

In the 2019 general election, the party contested nineteen seats and received 10,562 votes.

At the 2021 local election, the party appears not to have won any new seats. A seat was retained on Liverpool City Council. The party lost its last remaining unitary authority seat when Chris Ash of Dogsthorpe Ward of Peterborough City Council retired and no Liberal candidate stood. In the 2021 Mayor of Liverpool election the party's candidate Steve Radford received 7,135 votes (7%).

In the 2024 general election, the party contested 12 seats and received 6,375 votes.

The party stood Danny Clarke as its candidate in the 2025 Runcorn and Helsby by-election, receiving 454 votes.

== Elected members ==
The Liberal Party has never had any members in the Houses of Parliament, the Scottish Parliament, the Welsh Parliament, the European Parliament or the Northern Ireland and London Assemblies.

=== County, District and Unitary councillors ===
Council	Councillors
East Devon	1 / 60
Liverpool	3 / 85
North Yorkshire	1 / 90
Wyre Forest	2 / 33

=== Parish, Town and Community councillors ===
- 1 - Audley Rural Parish Council, Newcastle-under-Lyme, Staffordshire
- 2 - Carn Brea Parish Council, Cornwall
- 2 - Illogan Parish Council, Cornwall
- 2 - Kidderminster Town Council, Wyre Forest, Worcestershire
- 1 - Northleach Town Council, Cotswold, Gloucestershire
- 1 - Pickering Town Council, North Yorkshire
- 1 - St Mawgan-in-Pydar Parish Council, Cornwall
- 1 - Skellingthorpe Parish Council, North Kesteven, Lincolnshire

=== Number of councillors ===
Year	Unitary	County	District	Total	±
2003		5	22	27	▼3
2004		5	23	28	▲1
2005		2	23	25	▼3
2006		2	24	26	▲1
2007		2			
2008		2			
2009		2			
2010		2			
2011		2			
2012		2			
2013		3	18	21	
2014	3	3	16	19	▼2
2015	3			16	▼3
2016	3			15	▼1
2017	3			10	▼5
2018	2			7	▼3
2019	1		9	9	
2020	1		8	9	
2021				8	▼1
2022				5	▼3
2023				5	
2024				5	
2025				7	▲2
2026				7	

Totals include any in-year by-elections and defections, held/gain/loss are the changes since the start of the last municipal year. Figure from the BBC election results before 2003 lists Liberal Party seats amongst "Others" or "Independents".

== Controversy ==
In May 2021, the party's only candidate at the 2021 Scottish Parliament election, Derek Jackson in the Glasgow Southside constituency, was escorted from the count after arriving wearing rainbow arm-bands, yellow Star of David-style stars, and harassing Humza Yousaf, a candidate in the nearby Pollok constituency. Upon ejection from the count, the candidate and his supporters were photographed appearing to give Nazi salutes. The Liberal Party immediately suspended Jackson and issued a statement distancing itself from his comments and actions and apologising for any offence he may have caused; Jackson was expelled from the party on 9 May.

In May 2026, Alan Tormey, the former Liberal Party spokesperson for Environment and Energy admitted assault occasioning actual bodily harm, when he attacked his partner with a knife in late 2025. Tormey had previously served as a Liverpool City Councillor, elected in 2019 initially representing the Childwall ward for the Liberal Democrats, before joining the Liberal Party group in 2022. Tormey expressed an intention to stand as a candidate again in the future. In response, Liberal Party leader Steve Radford stated "it is inconceivable The Liberal Party would endorse him (Tormey) for public office in light of the conviction."

== See also ==
- Contributions to liberal theory
- Liberal Assembly
- Liberal democracy
- Liberal Democrats
- Liberal Party (1859–1988)
- Liberalism
- Liberalism in the United Kingdom
- Liberalism worldwide
- List of liberal parties
- Social Democratic Party (1988–1990), the rump successor to the SDP which did not merge into the Liberal Democrats
- Social Democratic Party (1990–present), a second rump successor to the SDP which continues to exist
- Whigs
- Whiggism
