= Gerhard Branstner =

German writer (1927–2008)

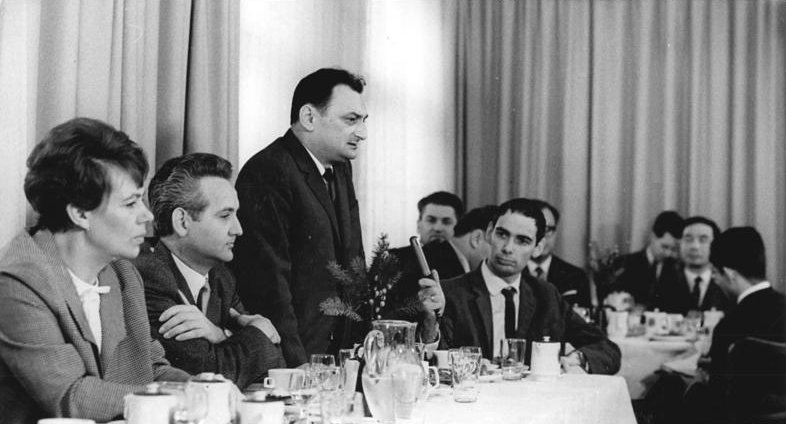
Gerhard Branstner (2. from l.) 4 December 1967 in East Berlin

Gerhard Branstner (25 May 1927 – 18 August 2008) was a German writer.

== Career ==
Born in Blankenhain, Branstner attended primary schools from 1934 and began a three-year administrative apprenticeship in 1942. After two weeks of front-line service, he was briefly taken as an American prisoner of war in 1945. Branstner was then a French prisoner of war (until 1947) and finally a Belgian prisoner of war, from which he was released in 1947. As the son of poor parents (his father was a porcelain worker), he was given the opportunity in the GDR from 1949 to 1951 to catch up on his A-levels at the Arbeiter-und-Bauern-Fakultät (abbreviated ABF loosely Industrial and Agricultural Workers' College) in Jena.

Branstner studied philosophy at the Humboldt University of Berlin from 1951 to 1956, where he later also worked as a lecturer. Branstner married in 1953. The marriage produced two sons (born 1955 and 1957) and a daughter (born 1959). With a thesis On Humour and its Role in Literature, he received his doctorate in 1963, later published as The Art of Humour. From 1962, he was chief editor at the Eulenspiegel-Verlag publishing house and at the publishing house Das Neue Berlin (The New Berlin). He became a freelance writer in 1968. The volume Ich kam, sah und lachte (I came, saw and laughed a reference to I came, saw and conquered) was published in 1973 and contains eight settings of Branstner poems. Branstner composed six of them, Siegfried Matthus one, Wolfgang Pietsch another one.

Branstner was unofficial collaborator of the GDR State Security under the code name "Friedrich".

In April 2000, Branstner was expelled from the Party of Democratic Socialism because of his article Klartext, Herr Comrade Gysi! published in the Junge Welt on 14 March 2000. However, the party expulsion was already rescinded in June by the party's federal arbitration commission because of his objection.

He lived his last years in Berlin, where, in addition to his work as an author, he mostly performed at theater events and readings. Branstner died in Berlin at the age of 81. His grave is located at the Dorotheenstadt Cemetery in Berlin.

== Work ==
- 1959: „Ist der Aphorismus ein verlorenes Kind?“
- 1961: „Zu Besuch auf der Erde“
- 1964: „Neulichkeiten“
- 1967: „Der verhängnisvolle Besuch. Kriminalroman“
- 1968: „Die Reise zum Stern der Beschwingten. Utopischer Roman“; „Die Weisheit des Humors“
- 1969: „Nepomuks Philosophische Kurzanekdoten“
- 1970: „Der falsche Mann im Mond. Utopischer Roman“
- 1971: „Der Narrenspiegel“
- 1973: „Ich kam, sah und lachte. Balladen, Anekdoten und Aphorismen“; „Der astronomische Dieb“; „Alarm am See“ (eine Polizeiruf-110-Folge)
- 1974: „Vom Himmel hoch“; „Plebejade“; „Der Narrenspiegel“
- 1976: „Der Sternenkavalier“
- 1977: „Der Himmel fällt aus den Wolken“; „Kantine“
- 1977: „Der Esel als Amtmann“: Buchverlag Der Morgen, (Ost-)Berlin 1977.
  - 1979: als Fischer Taschenbuch: „Der Esel als Amtmann oder Das Tier ist auch nur ein Mensch“ mit Zeichnungen von Hans Ticha. Frankfurt 1979, ISBN 3-596-22425-X.
- 1980: „Kunst des Humors“; „Handbuch der Heiterkeit“; „Der indiskrete Roboter“; „Der Esel als Amtmann“, ISBN 978-3-88074-184-3
- 1981: „Die Ochsenwette“
- 1982: „Sprucksäckel“
- 1984: „Das eigentliche Theater“
- 1985: „Das Verhängnis der Müllerstochter“; „Der negative Erfolg“
- 1987: „Heitere Poetik“
- 1988: „Heitere Dramatik“
- 1993: „Mensch – wohin?“
- 1996: „Verbürgerlichung“; „Das Prinzip Gleichheit“
- 1997: „Revolution auf Knien“; „Das philosophische Gesetz der Ökologie“
- 1998: „Rotfeder“; „Der eigentliche Mensch“
- 1999: „Witz und Wesen der Lebenskunst“
- 2000: „Marxismus der Beletage“; „Die Welt in Kurzfassung“, ISBN 978-3-89706-895-7
- 2001: „Das System Heiterkeit“
- 2002: „Die neue Weltofferte“; „Gegenwelt“; „Die Weisheit des Humors“
- 2004: „Branstners Brevier – Das Kommunistische Manifest von heute“; „Die Narrenschaukel“, ISBN 978-3-938142-11-0
- 2006: „Philosophie der Geschichte“, „Philosophie der Kunst“ und „Sonny Girls“ – In Die Pyramide, ISBN 3-928498-55-X; Neue Lieder, ISBN 978-3-928498-75-3; „Kuriose Geschichten“, ISBN 978-3-928498-57-9
- 2007: „Liebengrün“, Autobiografie, Kay Homilius-Verlag Berlin, ISBN 9783897068506; „Die Hornisse - Philosophische Streitschriften“, ISBN 978-3-928498-78-4

== Reviewers on Branstner ==
A specialist in decidedly humorous science fiction is Gerhard Branstner. His ... Die Reise zum Stern der Beschwingten is a swiftian journey through various grotesque states, including a state of newt capitalists or capitalist newts. Linguistically, the inhabitants of the 'Sterns der Beschwingten' play a cheerful game with reality. It is precisely through this light-hearted game, which disguises the seriousness, that reality is all the more aptly described..‘

— Franz Rottensteiner
