= Når jeg ser et rødt flag smælde =

English: When I see a red flag billow
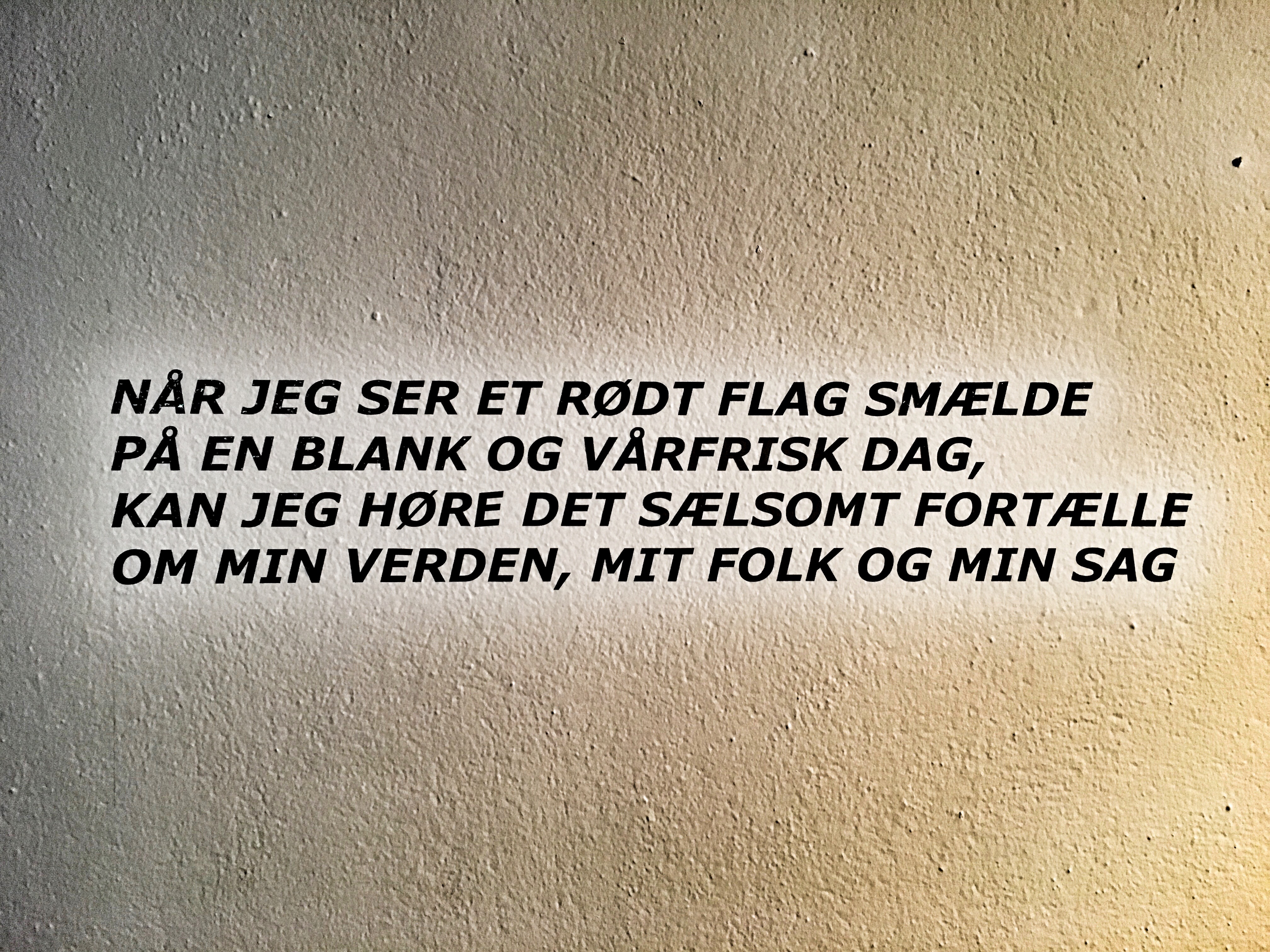
- A part of the first stanza of Når jeg ser et rødt flag smælde
- Party anthem of Social Democrats (Denmark)
- Also known as: Ung Flagsang
- Lyrics: Oskar Hansen, 1923
- Music: Johannes Madsen, 1923
- Published: 1923

"Når jeg ser et rødt flag smælde" (Danish: [nɒ: jɑɪ̯ seɐ̯ ed ʁœd flæ: smɛlə]; lit. 'When I see a red flag billow') is the anthem of the Danish Social Democrats.

It is sung at national meetings and congresses, as well as on election nights – regardless of the result.

== History ==
The lyrics were written by Oskar Hansen and the music composed by Johannes Madsen in 1923. It was first published in the magazine Ungdomsappellen in 1923 and presented at a Social Democratic Youth of Denmark event in August 1923. It became immensely popular within Social Democratic circles.
