= Louis Fürnberg =

Czech-German writer, composer and diplomat

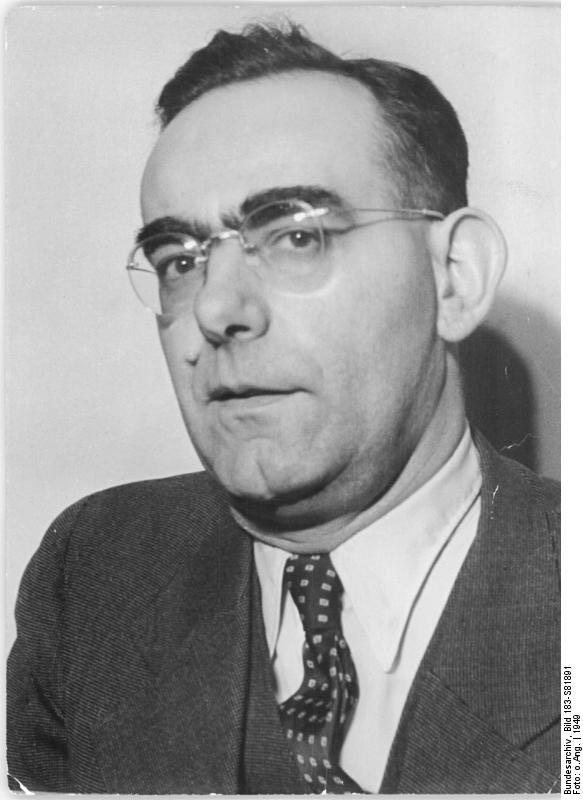
Fürnberg in 1949

Louis Fürnberg (24 May 1909 – 23 June 1957) was a Czech-German writer, poet and journalist, composer and diplomat. He wrote the Lied der Partei ("The Party is Always Right"), the song that served for years as the official anthem of the East German ruling Socialist Unity Party (SED).

== Life ==
Fürnberg was born into a German-speaking Jewish family of textile factory owners in the Moravian city of Jihlava (German: Iglau), then part of the Austria-Hungary. His mother, Berta, died shortly after his birth. His father, Jakob Fürnberg, moved the family when he married for a second time. Thus, Louis Fürnberg spent his childhood and youth in Karlovy Vary (German: Karlsbad). His younger brother, Walter Fürnberg, was born in 1913. After the First World War and the dissolution of Austria-Hungary, they became citizens of Czechoslovakia. Fürnberg attended Gymnasium in Karlovy Vary. Following his father's wishes, he began an apprenticeship as an artistic ceramist in Knolls Porzellanfabrik (Knoll's Porcelain Factory) in Rybáře (today part of Karlovy Vary), but he had to withdraw in 1926 due to tubercular disease. As a 17-year-old, he joined the Socialist Youth. In 1927, he moved to Prague, and joined the German Tradeschool (Deutsche Handelsakademie). There he published his poems in the local German-speaking press.

In 1928 he joined the German section of the Communist Party of Czechoslovakia. In May 1932, he founded the Agitprop group "Echo von Links"; between 1932 and 1936 he worked as their copywriter. While working on a project for the group in 1936, Fürnberg met Lotte Wertheimer, the daughter of a Jewish entrepreneur from Prague, who was also a Communist. They married in 1937. Until 1939, he was active in the Communist press in Prague, for example since 1934, he had been the editor of the Arbeiter-Illustrierte-Zeitung (A-I-Z), after it had to move from Berlin to Prague. He also worked on Gegenangriff with Bruno Frei. After his tuberculosis re-occurred in 1936, he went to the spa in Lugano in the hope of a cure. Due to this, "Echo von Links" had to fold.

After the German invasion of Czechoslovakia in 1939, the Fürnbergs attempted to flee to Poland, but were betrayed and captured. While Fürnberg's wife was released after two months and was able to flee to London, Fürnberg remained imprisoned. He was transported to several different prisons and was tortured. His wife's family were later able to bribe the Gestapo and have Fürnberg deported to Italy where he was reunited with his wife as 1939 turned into 1940. They fled further to Yugoslavia; the Fürnberg's son was born in 1940 in Belgrade. They continued to flee further away until 1941, when they reached Palestine. The members of their family who were unable to leave German controlled territory were murdered in the Holocaust. In Palestine, they became friends with Arnold Zweig who was living in Haifa. Fürnberg wrote for magazines such as "Orient" which were aimed at fellow German-speaking exiles.

In 1946, after the end of the Second World War, Fürnberg returned to Prague. In the two years that followed, Fürnberg was again a journalist and correspondent for several newspapers in Prague. In 1947, his daughter Alena was born. He then began to work for the Ministry of Information. From 1949 to 1952, he worked as a cultural attaché in the Czechoslovak embassy in East Berlin. At the end of this period, he returned to Czechoslovakia. The conspicuous antisemitism of the late-Stalin era of the Soviet Union had a particularly strong effect in Czechoslovakia, under the government of Klement Gottwald. Fürnberg was even put under pressure to change his name to Lubomír Fyrnberg. This was also the time of the purge of the leadership of the Communist Party of Czechoslovakia, after the Slánský trial. Several of Fürnberg's friends and acquaintances were affected by the purge, and this had an impact on Fürnberg's health.

In 1953, Fürnberg was awarded the Julius Fucik Prize for his journalism, named for Czechoslovak journalist who was murdered by the Nazis.

In 1954, Fürnberg, his wife and children moved to Weimar, then in East Germany. There, he worked as the deputy director of the National Research and Memorial Centres of Classical German Literature in Weimar (predecessor of Klassik Stiftung Weimar) and as the associate editor of the Weimarer Beiträge. In 1955, he became a member of the Academy of Arts in Berlin. In the same year he had a heart attack that he never fully recovered from. He died in Weimar in the night of 23 June 1957, at the age of 48, and was buried in a grave of honour in the Historical Cemetery, Weimar after a solemn funeral. After his death, his widow, who had worked as a radio editor for many years, led the Louis Fürnberg Archive in Weimar. She herself died there in January 2004 at the age of 92.

In 1961, a memorial to Fürnberg was revealed in the Park an der Ilm. It was made by the sculptors Martin Reiner and Franz Dospiel.

On the 100th anniversary of Fürnberg the "Stiftung Weimarer Klassik" (Weimar Classicism Foundation) honoured the poet with a commemorative ceremony in the city palace. The poet's daughter, Alena, read some of her poetry, and the writer Wulf Kirsten made a speech in the poet's honour. At Buchenwald, the room in which Fürnberg worked was rebuilt, and can now be visited by appointment.

== Works ==
Fürnberg saw himself as a political poet. His lyrics were often addressed to his comrades in the cause for examples, "Was ich singe, sing ich den Genossen. Ihre Träume gehen durch mein Lied." (What I sing, I sing to the comrades. Your dreams go through my song.).

Fürnberg mostly wrote poems, narratives and novels. His novella 'Die Begegnung in Weimar' (The Encounter in Weimar) deals with the meeting of Adam Mickiewiczs and Johann Wolfgang von Goethe. Fürnberg's dramas, festival works and cantatas show his communist beliefs, which he held until his death.

Even today, Fürnberg's name is most strongly associated with the song "Die Partei" (The Party is always right), which he wrote after he was insulted not to be invited to the 9th Congress of the Communist Party of Czechoslovakia in May 1949. Due to the fame of the song, his other works are less well known. After the 20th Congress of the Communist Party of the Soviet Union in 1956, several of his songs were edited to remove references to Stalin as part of the ideological shift of the Soviet Union and associated countries. This included removal of Stalin from the lyrics of Die Partei, the renaming of the song "Lied von Stalin" (Stalin's Song) to "Lied vom Menschen" (Song from the People), and the renaming of "Dieses Lied weihe ich Stalin" (This song I dedicate to Stalin) to "Dieses Lied weihe ich den Sowjets" (This song I dedicate to the Soviets). Other changes include replacing a reference to Stalin and Lenin with a reference to Marx and Engels. Fürnberg's poetry was also altered, and the poems"Stalins Geburt," "Der junge Stalin," and "Der größte Schüler" ("Stalin's Birth", "The Young Stalin", "The Greatest Student") were removed from collections of his work.

Fürnberg occasionally used the pseudonyms Nuntius or Nuncius after 1932.

=== Cultural references to Fürnberg's work ===
German band Puhdys referenced Fürnberg's work "Alt möcht ich werden" in their 1976 hit song "Alt wie ein Baum".
