= Golda Schultz =

South African soprano

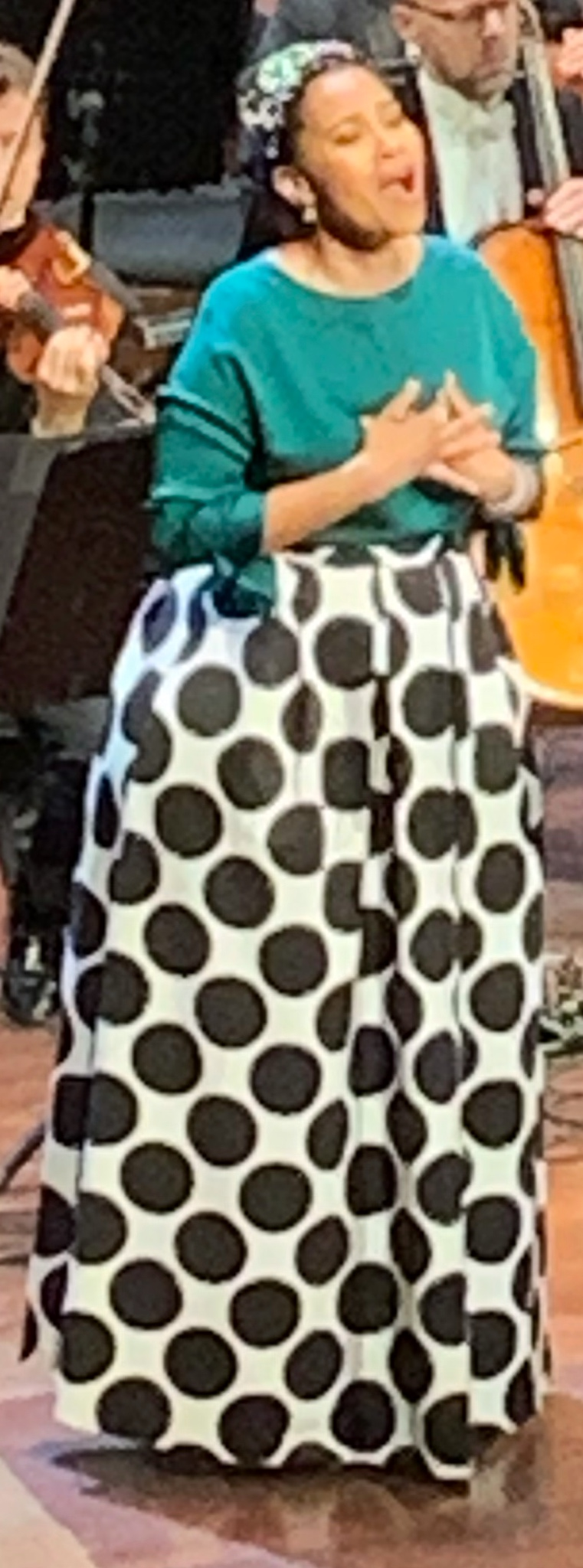
Golda Schultz in 2021

Golda Schultz is a South African soprano. She was member of the ensemble of the Bavarian State Opera.

== Early life and education ==
Golda Schultz, daughter of a mathematics professor, grew up in Bloemfontein.

She studied singing at the University of Cape Town and at the Juilliard School in New York. She was also taught by Johan Botha, Kiri Te Kanawa, and Michelle Breedt.

== Career ==
From 2011 to 2013, Schultz was a member of an opera studio. From 2014 to 2018 she was a member of the ensemble of the Bavarian State Opera.

She also had several roles at the Stadttheater Klagenfurt from 2013 to 2015, and appeared for the first time at the Salzburg Festival in 2015, where she played the role of Sophie in Der Rosenkavalier.

In 2016, Schultz sang Susanna in The Marriage of Figaro at la Scala. In 2017, she was again heard at the Salzburg Festival, this time as Vitellia in La clemenza di Tito. In October 2017, she made her debut at the Metropolitan Opera in New York City as Pamina in The Magic Flute.

On 19 December 2020, at the WDR Christmas Concert in the Marienbasilika in Kevelaer, she sang, among other works the Ave Maria by Pietro Mascagni and Mariae Wiegenlied by Max Reger.

== Selected roles ==
Golda Schultz portrayed, among others, the following roles:

- Dido (Purcell: Dido and Aeneas)
- Contessa Almaviva (Mozart: Le nozze di Figaro)
- Donna Elvira (Mozart: Don Giovanni)
- Pamina (Mozart: Die Zauberflöte)
- Susanna (Mozart: Le nozze di Figaro)
- Ines (Verdi: Il trovatore)
- Anna (Verdi: Nabucco)
- Mrs. Alice Ford (Verdi: Falstaff)
- Liù (Puccini: Turandot)
- Sophie (Strauss: Der Rosenkavalier)
- Freia (Wagner: Das Rheingold)
- Ortlinde (Wagner: Die Walküre)
- Elisabeth Zimmer (Henze: Elegy for Young Lovers)
- Clara (Gershwin: Porgy and Bess)
- Anna Trulov (Stravinsky: The Rake's progress)
- Agathe (von Weber: Der Freischütz)
