= Liberator (magazine) =

British political magazine

Liberator is a radical liberal United Kingdom magazine associated with but not officially connected to the Liberal Democrats. Founded in 1970 as the magazine of the then Young Liberals, it has often published articles critical of the party leadership, in particular over the Liberal Party's debacle over nuclear disarmament in 1986, the merger of the Liberal Party and Social Democratic Party and the Tony Blair-Paddy Ashdown project.

Previous editors include Peter Hain in 1973–75, later a Labour MP. Since 1982, the magazine has been edited by an editorial collective, whose former members include Liz Barker, now a Liberal Democrat peer. The magazine merged with Radical Bulletin, mostly topical and distinctly off-message news, in 1983.

Regular features include a column by the fictional peer Lord Bonkers who "was Liberal MP for Rutland South-West between 1906 and 1910. Since 1990 his diaries have appeared in Liberator magazine, giving a unique perspective on British politics. Lord Bonkers' Diary is dictated to Jonathan Calder".

A history of the magazine was published in the 300th issue in December 2004.
