= Liberal Assembly =

The Liberal Party Assembly was the annual party conference of the British Liberal Party before its merger with the Social Democratic Party in 1988 to form the Liberal Democrats; the name is still used by the continuity Liberal Party created as its replacement. It traditionally concludes with all members rising to sing "The Land", which is also sung at the end of the Liberal Democrat Conference.

The Assembly is the sovereign body responsible for policy decisions and constitutional changes, making it the most democratic of the UK parties.

The modern Liberal Party's annual gatherings continue the numbering sequence used by the pre-1988 party. For example, the 2007 Assembly, held in Wolverhampton, was officially the 122nd Liberal Party Assembly.
