= Winston Churchill's Liberal Party years, 1904–1924 =

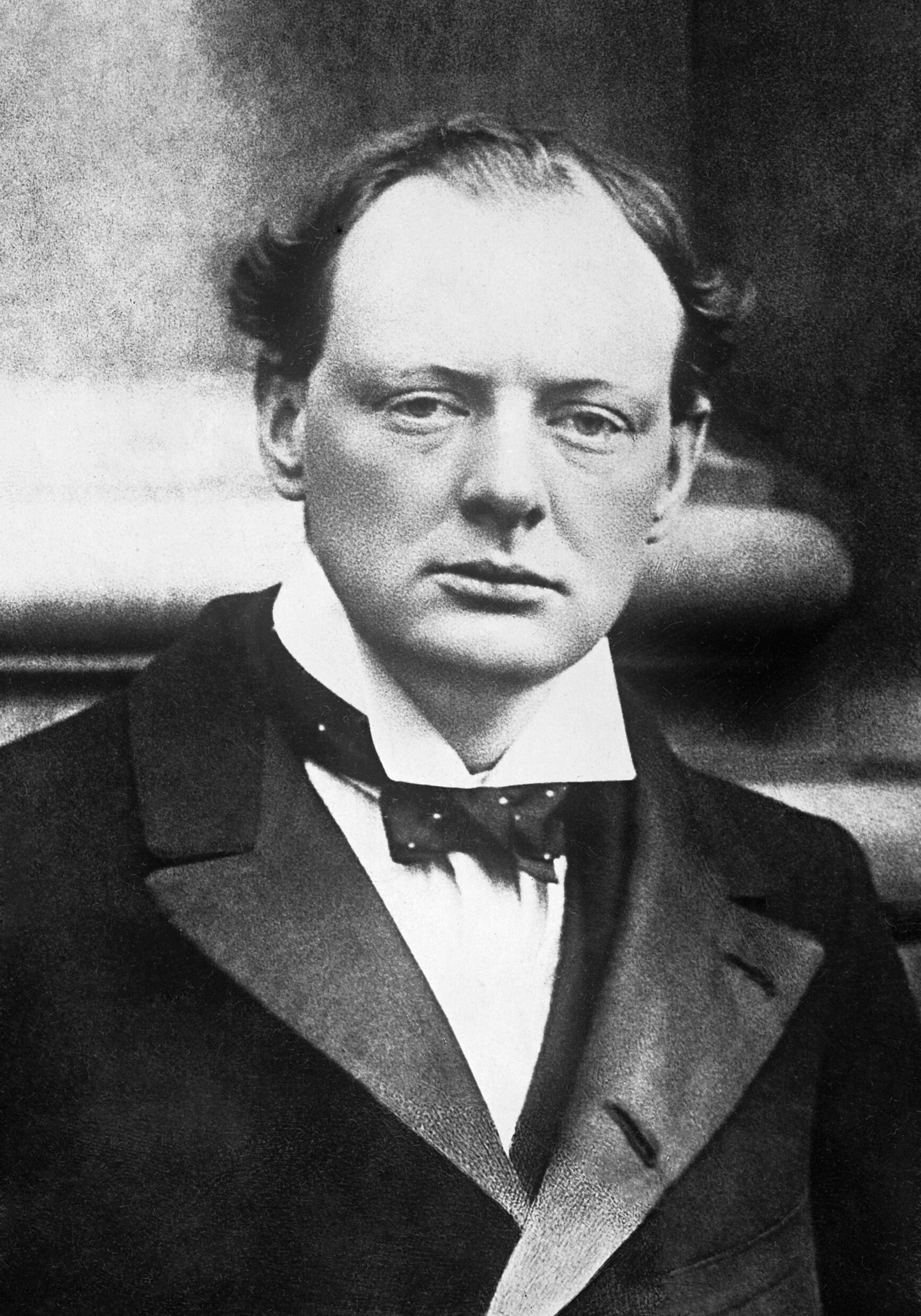
Winston Churchill in 1904. He "crossed the floor" in May that year.

Winston Churchill was first elected to the UK Parliament at the 1900 general election as one of two Conservative Party members representing the Oldham constituency. He took his seat in the House of Commons in February 1901 but soon became critical of the Conservative government on a number of issues. On 31 May 1904, he formally crossed the floor of the Commons to join the opposition Liberals, remaining a party member until March 1924.

Churchill was less prolific as a writer through this period; he completed a two-volume biography of his father in 1906 but did not begin his next major work, The World Crisis, until December 1921. He married Clementine Hozier in September 1908 and their eldest child, Diana was born in July 1909. As a Liberal, Churchill held several ministerial roles, most notably as Home Secretary (1910–1911) and as First Lord of the Admiralty at the beginning of the First World War. He took most of the blame for the failed Gallipoli campaign in 1915 and resigned from the government in November of that year to rejoin the Army. In January 1916, he was promoted temporarily to lieutenant-colonel of the 6th Battalion, Royal Scots Fusiliers who were active near Ploegsteert. Following a merger of battalions, he relinquished command and returned to politics. He reverted to the rank of major on 16 May.

In July 1917, Churchill was appointed Minister of Munitions by the new prime minister, David Lloyd George, and voted to support the Representation of the People Act 1918. In January 1919, he became jointly the Secretary of State for War and the Secretary of State for Air. In February 1921, he became the Secretary of State for the Colonies. Churchill suffered personal tragedies in 1921 with the deaths of both his mother and his two-year-old daughter, Marigold. His youngest child, Mary, was born in September 1922 and, in the same month, he completed purchase of his family home, Chartwell, in Kent.

Lloyd George's coalition splintered to necessitate the November 1922 general election. Churchill lost his seat at Dundee, which he had represented since May 1908. Out of Parliament, he devoted himself to painting and writing The World Crisis. In December 1923, he stood for the Liberals at Leicester West in the general election but lost. He was defeated again at the Westminster Abbey by-election the following March and became thoroughly disillusioned with the Liberal Party. In May 1924, he spoke at a Conservative meeting in Liverpool and, declaring that the Liberal Party was finished as a political force, he urged all Liberals to support the Conservatives to try and defeat the Labour Party and stop the spread of socialism. In October, following discussions with prime minister Stanley Baldwin, Churchill stood as a Constitutionalist candidate in the general election at Epping. He won and Baldwin appointed him as Chancellor of the Exchequer. Churchill severed his ties with the Liberal Party and rejoined the Conservative Party.

== Liberal MP: 1904–1908 ==
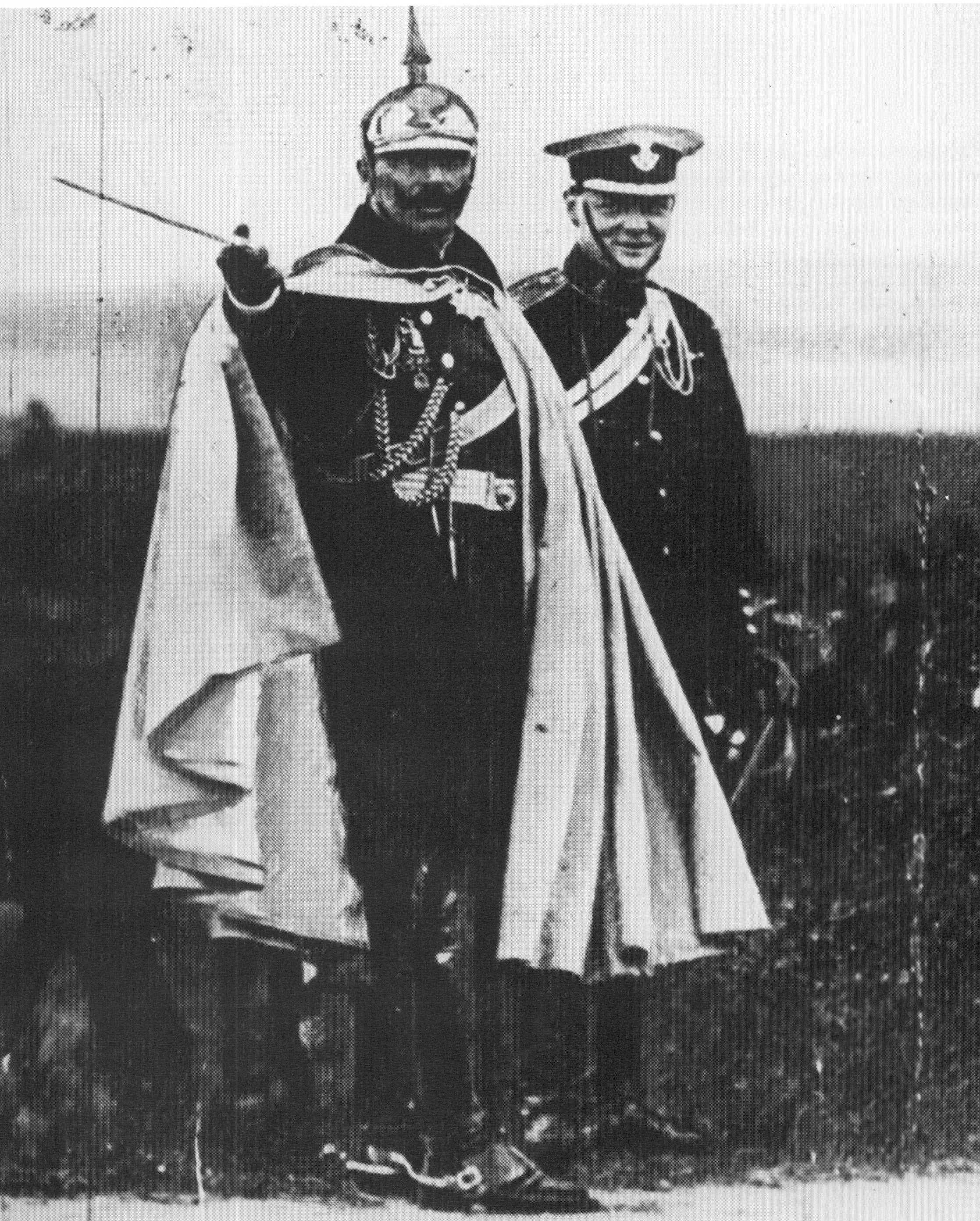
Churchill and German Kaiser Wilhelm II during a military manoeuvre near Breslau, Silesia, in 1906.

In the early 1900s, as an MP for the Conservative Party, Churchill had been growing dissatisfied with the Conservative Party's approach on several key issues. On 31 May 1904, as Parliament resumed following its Whitsun recess, he crossed the floor of the House of Commons, defecting from the Conservatives to sit as a member of the Liberal Party. His cousin Ivor Guest followed him. Suggested reasons for Churchill's changing sides have included the prospect of a ministerial post and salary, a desire to eliminate poverty, and concerns for the working class, (Note: Hill sees Churchill’s position on free trade land taxation as being the way to remove poverty as correct.) but the immediately preceding events were the rift with the Conservative Party over trade tariffs. He may simply have been more sympathetic to the Liberals, despite being personally conservative and traditionalist; in 1962 he reportedly told another MP "I'm a Liberal. Always have been." As a Liberal, he continued to campaign for free trade. (Note: He published For Free Trade, a collection of his speeches on the topic.)

In December 1905, Balfour resigned as prime minister and King Edward VII invited the Liberal leader Henry Campbell-Bannerman to take his place. Hoping to secure a working majority in the House of Commons, Campbell-Bannerman called a general election for January 1906, which the Liberals won. Having had a previous invitation from the Manchester Liberals to stand in their constituency, Churchill did so, winning the Manchester North West seat. January also saw the publication of Churchill's biography of his father; he received an advance payment of £8000 for the book, the highest ever paid for a political biography in Britain to that point. It was generally well received. It was also at this time that the first biography of Churchill himself, written by the Liberal Alexander MacCallum Scott, was published.

In the new government, Churchill became Under-Secretary of State for the Colonial Office, a position that he had requested. He worked beneath the Secretary of State for the Colonies, Victor Bruce, 9th Earl of Elgin, and took Edward Marsh as his secretary; the latter remained Churchill's secretary for 25 years. In this junior ministerial position, Churchill was first tasked with helping to draft a constitution for the Transvaal. In 1906, he helped oversee the granting of a government to the Orange River Colony. In dealing with southern Africa, he sought to ensure equality between the British and Boer. He also announced a gradual phasing out of the use of Chinese indentured labourers in South Africa; he and the government decided that a sudden ban would cause too much upset in the colony and might damage the economy. He expressed concerns about the relations between European settlers and the black African population; after Zulu launched the Bambatha Rebellion in Natal, he complained of Europeans' "disgusting butchery of the natives".

In August 1906, Churchill holidayed on a yacht in Deauville, France, spending much of his time playing polo or gambling. From there he proceeded to Paris and then Switzerland—where he climbed the Eggishorn—and then to Berlin and Silesia, where he was a guest of Kaiser Wilhelm II. He went then to Venice, and from there toured Italy by motorcar with his friend, Lionel Rothschild. In May 1907, he holidayed at the home of another friend, Maurice de Forest, in Biarritz. In the autumn, he embarked on a tour of Europe and Africa. He travelled through France, Italy, Malta, and Cyprus, before moving through the Suez Canal to Aden and Berbera. Sailing to Mombasa, he travelled by rail through the Kenya Colony—stopping for big game hunting in Simba—before heading through the Uganda Protectorate and then sailing up the River Nile. He wrote about his experiences for Strand Magazine and later published them in book form as My African Journey.

== Asquith government: 1908–1915 ==
=== President of the Board of Trade: 1908–1910 ===
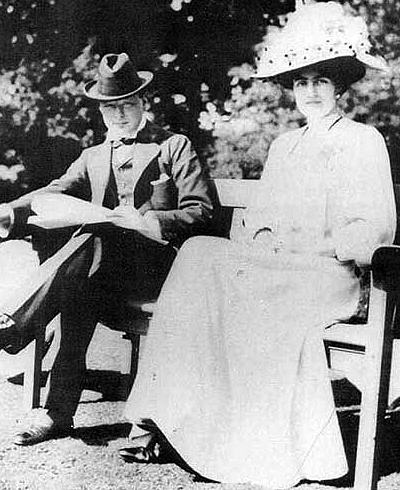
Churchill and his fiancée Clementine Hozier shortly before their marriage in 1908.

When Asquith succeeded Campbell-Bannerman in 1908, Churchill was promoted to the Cabinet as President of the Board of Trade. Aged 33, he was the youngest Cabinet member since 1866. Newly appointed Cabinet ministers were legally obliged to seek re-election at a by-election; in April, Churchill lost the Manchester North West by-election to the Conservative candidate by 429 votes. The Liberals then stood him in a by-election in the Scottish safe seat of Dundee, where he won comfortably. In his Cabinet role, Churchill worked with Liberal politician David Lloyd George to champion social reform. In one speech Churchill stated that although the "vanguard" of the British people "enjoys all the delights of all the ages, our rearguard struggles out into conditions which are crueller than barbarism". To deal with this, he promoted what he called a "network of State intervention and regulation" akin to that in Germany. His speeches on these issues were published in the volumes Liberalism and the Social Problem and The People's Rights.

One of the first tasks he faced was in arbitrating an industrial dispute among ship-workers and their employers on the River Tyne. He then established a Standing Court of Arbitration to deal with future industrial disputes, establishing a reputation as a conciliator. Arguing that workers should have their working hours reduced, Churchill promoted the Mines Eight Hours Bill—which legally prohibited miners working more than an eight-hour day—introducing its second reading in the House of Commons. In 1908, he introduced the Trade Boards Bill to parliament, which would establish a Board of Trade which could prosecute exploitative employers, establish the principle of minimum wage, and the right of workers to have meal breaks. The bill passed with a large majority. In May, he proposed the Labour Exchanges Bill which sought to establish over 200 Labour Exchanges through which the unemployed would be assisted in finding employment. He also promoted the idea of an unemployment insurance scheme, which would be part-funded by the state.

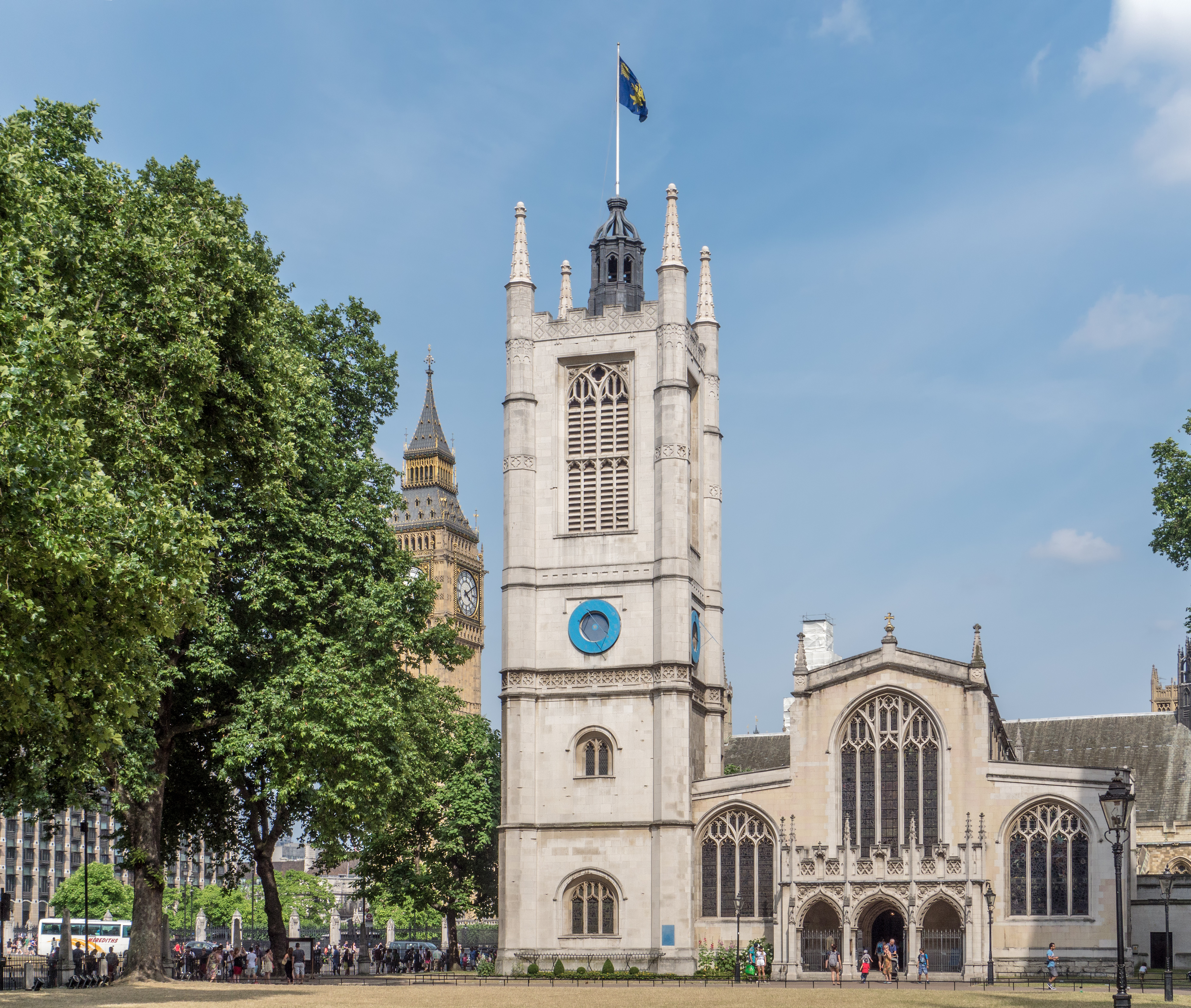
Churchill and Clementine were married at St Margaret's in Westminster.

To ensure funding for these social reforms, he and Lloyd George denounced Reginald McKennas' expansion of warship production. Churchill openly ridiculed those who thought war with Germany was inevitable—according to biographer Roy Jenkins he was going through "a pro-German phase"—and in autumn 1909 he visited Germany, spending time with the Kaiser and observing German Army manoeuvres.

In his personal life, Churchill proposed marriage to Clementine Hozier; they were married in September at St Margaret's, Westminster. They honeymooned in Baveno, Venice, and Veveří Castle in Moravia; before settling into a London home at 33 Eccleston Square. The following July they had a daughter, Diana.

To pass its social reforms into law, Asquith's Liberal government presented them in the form of the People's Budget. Conservative opponents of the reform set up the Budget Protest League; supporters of it established the Budget League, of which Churchill became president. The budget passed in the House of Commons but was rejected by the Conservative peers who dominated the House of Lords; this threatened Churchill's social reforms. Churchill warned that such upper-class obstruction would anger working-class Britons and could lead to class war. To deal with the deadlock, the government called a January 1910 general election, which resulted in a narrow Liberal victory; Churchill retained his seat at Dundee. After the election, he proposed the abolition of the House of Lords in a cabinet memorandum, suggesting that it be replaced either by a unicameral system or by a new, smaller second chamber that lacked an in-built advantage for the Conservatives. In April, the Lords relented and the budget was passed.

=== Home Secretary: 1910–1911 ===
... I wanted to draw the attention of the country, by means of cases perfectly legitimate in themselves, to the evil by which 7,000 lads of the poorer classes are sent to gaol every year for offences for which, if the noble Lord had committed them at College, he would not have been subjected to the slightest degree of inconvenience.

— Winston Churchill in the House of Commons, 1910

In February 1910, Churchill was promoted to Home Secretary, giving him control over the police and prison services, and he implemented a prison reform programme. He introduced a distinction between criminal and political prisoners, with prison rules for the latter being relaxed. He tried to establish libraries for prisoners, and introduced a measure ensuring that each prison must put on either a lecture or a concert for the entertainment of prisoners four times a year. He reduced the length of solitary confinement for first offenders to one month and for recidivists to three months, and spoke out against what he regarded as the excessively lengthy sentences meted out to perpetrators of certain crimes. He proposed the abolition of automatic imprisonment of those who failed to pay fines, and put a stop to the imprisonment of those aged between 16 and 21 except in cases where they had committed the most serious offences. Of the 43 capital sentences passed while he was Home Secretary, he commuted 21 of them.

One of the major domestic issues in Britain was that of women's suffrage. By this point, Churchill supported giving women the vote, although would only back a bill to that effect if it had majority support from the (male) electorate. His proposed solution was a referendum on the issue, but this found no favour with Asquith and women's suffrage remained unresolved until 1918. Many Suffragettes took Churchill for a committed opponent of women's suffrage, and targeted his meetings for protest. In November 1910, the suffragist Hugh Franklin attacked Churchill with a whip; Franklin was arrested and imprisoned for six weeks.

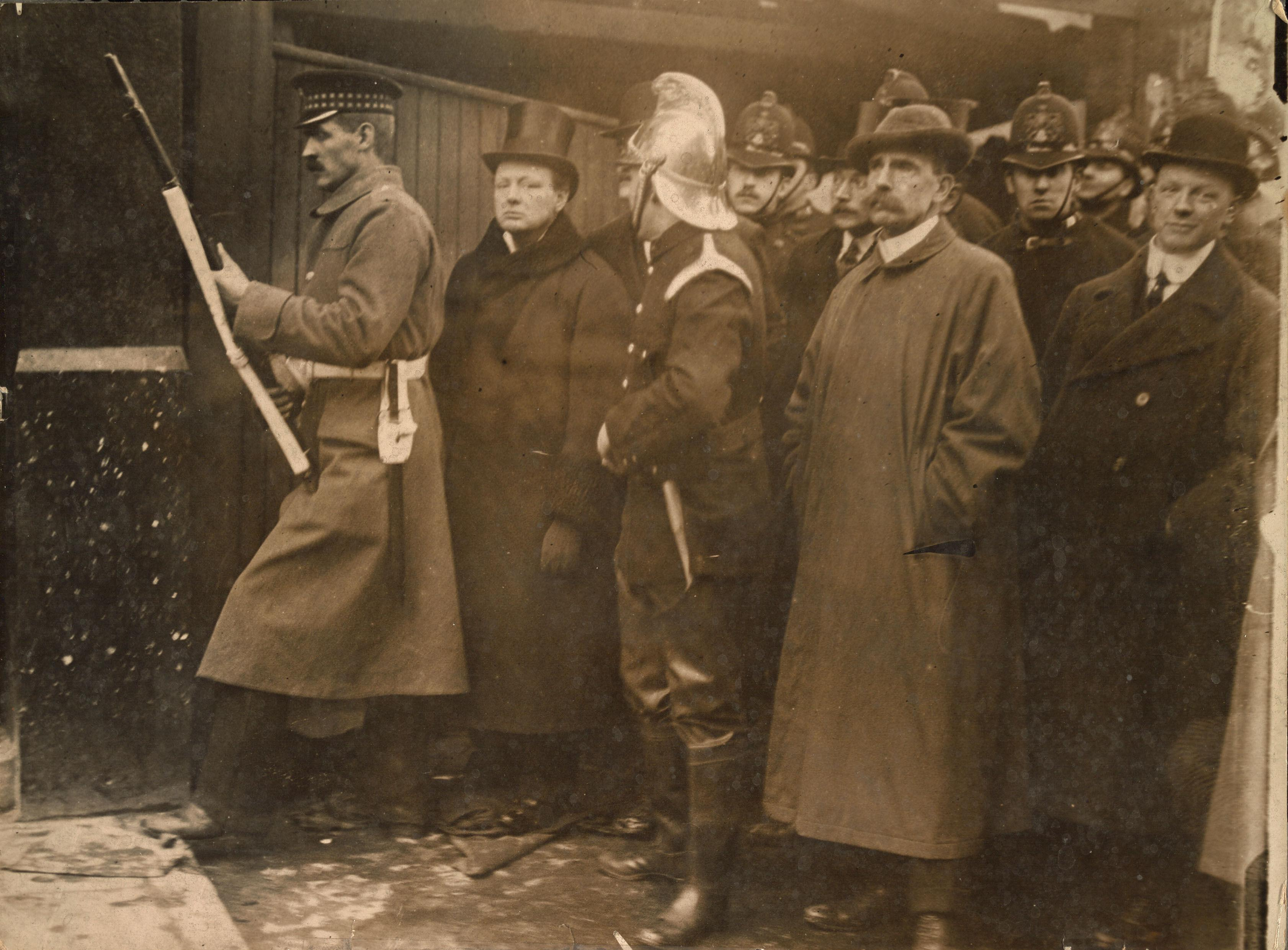
Churchill (second left) photographed at the Siege of Sidney Street.

In the summer of 1910, Churchill spent two months on de Forest's yacht in the Mediterranean. Back in Britain, he was tasked with dealing with the Tonypandy Riot, in which coal miners in the Rhondda Valley violently protested against their working conditions. The Chief Constable of Glamorgan requested troops to help police quell the rioting. Churchill, learning that the troops were already travelling, allowed them to go as far as Swindon and Cardiff, but blocked their deployment; he was concerned that the use of troops could lead to bloodshed. Instead he sent 270 London police—who were not equipped with firearms—to assist their Welsh counterparts. As the riots continued, he offered the protesters an interview with the government's chief industrial arbitrator, which they accepted. Privately, Churchill regarded both the mine owners and striking miners as being "very unreasonable". The Times and other media outlets accused him of being too soft on the rioters; conversely, many in the Labour Party, which was linked to the trade unions, regarded him as having been too heavy-handed.

Asquith called a general election for December 1910, in which the Liberals were re-elected and Churchill again secured his Dundee seat. In January 1911, Churchill became involved with the Siege of Sidney Street; three Latvian burglars had killed several police officers and hidden in a house in London's East End, which was surrounded by police. Churchill joined the police although did not direct their operation. After the house caught on fire, he told the fire brigade not to proceed into the house because of the threat that the armed Latvians posed to them. After the event, two of the burglars were found dead. Although he faced criticism for his decision, he stated that he "thought it better to let the house burn down rather than spend good British lives in rescuing those ferocious rascals".

In March 1911, he introduced the second reading of the Coal Mines Bill to parliament, which—when implemented into law—introduced stricter safety standards to coal mines. He also formulated the Shops Bill to improve the working conditions of shop workers; it faced opposition from shop owners and only passed into law in a much emasculated form. To maintain pressure on this issue, he became president of the Early Closing Association and remained in that position until the early 1940s. In April, Lloyd George introduced the first health and unemployment insurance legislation, the National Insurance Act 1911; Churchill had been instrumental in drafting it. In May, his wife gave birth to their second child, Randolph, named after Churchill's father. In 1911, he was tasked with dealing with escalating civil strife, sending troops into Liverpool to quell protesting dockers and rallying against a national railway strike. As the Agadir Crisis emerged, which threatened the outbreak of war between Germany and France, Churchill suggested that—should negotiations fail—the UK should form an alliance with France and Russia and safeguard the independence of Belgium, the Netherlands, and Denmark in the face of possible German expansionism. The Agadir Crisis had a dramatic effect on Churchill and his views about the need for naval expansion.

=== First Lord of the Admiralty ===
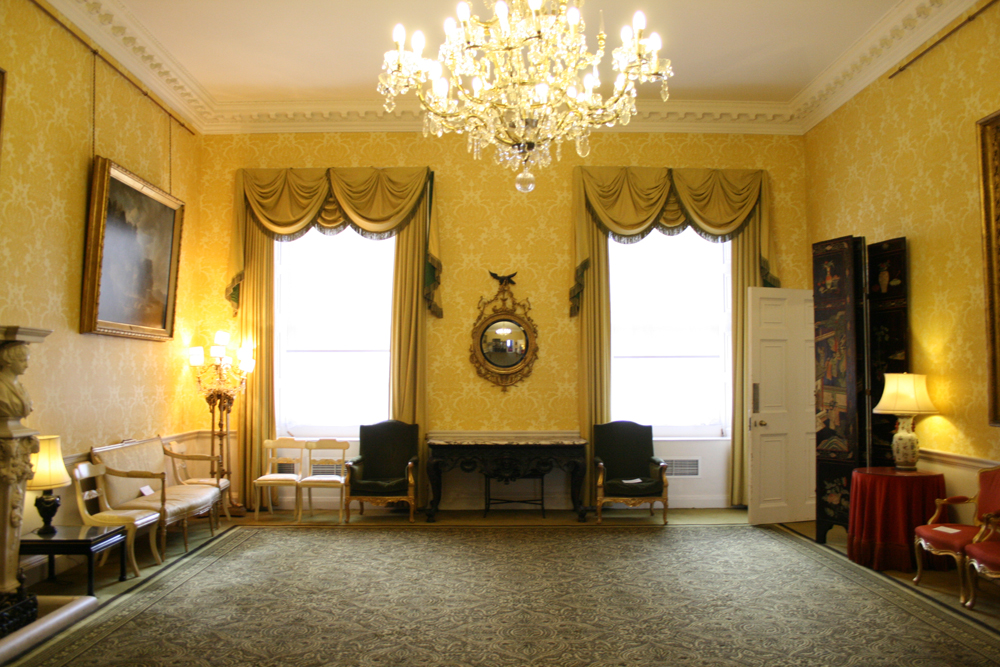
As First Lord of the Admiralty, Churchill's London residency became Admiralty House (music room pictured).

In October 1911, Asquith appointed Churchill First Lord of the Admiralty. He settled into his official London residence at Admiralty House, and established his new office aboard the admiralty yacht, the Enchantress. Over the next two and a half years he focused on naval preparation, visiting naval stations and dockyards, seeking to improve naval morale, and scrutinising German naval developments. After the German government passed the German Navy Law to increase warship production, Churchill vowed that Britain would do the same and that for every new battleship built by the Germans, Britain would build two. Believing an oligarchy of "the landlord ascendancy" had taken over Germany, he hoped that war would be averted if Germany's "democratic forces" could re-assert control of its government. To discourage conflict, he invited Germany to engage in a mutual de-escalation of the two countries naval building projects, but his offer was rebuffed.

As part of his naval reforms, he pushed for higher pay and greater recreational facilities for naval staff, an increase in the building of submarines, and a renewed focus on the Royal Naval Air Service, encouraging them to experiment with how aircraft could be used for military purposes. He coined the term "seaplane" and ordered 100 to be constructed. In 1913 he began taking flying lessons at Eastchurch air station, although close friends urged him to stop given the dangers involved. Some Liberals objected to his levels of naval expenditure; in December 1913 he threatened to resign if his proposal for four new battleships in 1914–15 was rejected. In June 1914, he convinced the House of Commons to authorise the government purchase of a 51 per cent share in the profits of oil produced by the Anglo-Persian Oil Company, to secure continued oil access for the Royal Navy. As a supporter of eugenics, he participated in the drafting of the Mental Deficiency Act 1913; however, the Act, in the form eventually passed, rejected his preferred method of sterilisation of the feeble-minded in favour of their confinement in institutions.

I admit that the perfectly genuine apprehensions of the majority of the people of North-East Ulster constitute the most serious obstacle to a thoroughly satisfactory settlement ... But whatever Ulster's rights may be, she cannot stand in the way of the whole of the rest of Ireland.

— Winston Churchill, introducing the second reading of the Home Rule Bill, April 1912

Taking centre stage was the issue of how Britain's government should respond to the Irish home rule movement. In 1912, Asquith's government forwarded the Home Rule Bill, which if passed into law would grant Irish home rule. Churchill supported the bill and urged Ulster Unionists—a largely Protestant community who desired continued political unity with Britain—to accept it. He opposed partition of Ireland, and in 1913 suggested that Ulster have some autonomy from an independent Irish government. Many Ulster Unionists rejected any option that left them under the jurisdiction of a Dublin-based government and the Ulster Volunteers threatened an uprising to establish an independent Protestant state in Ulster. Churchill was the Cabinet minister tasked with giving an ultimatum to those threatening violence, doing so in a Bradford speech in March 1914. Following a Cabinet decision, he boosted the naval presence in Ireland to deal with any Unionist uprising; Conservatives accused him of trying to initiate an "Ulster Pogrom". Seeking further compromise to calm the Ulster Volunteers, Churchill suggested that Ireland remain part of a federal United Kingdom; this in turn angered Liberals and Irish nationalists.

=== Outbreak of the First World War ===
I cannot feel that we in this island [i.e. Britain] are in any serious degree responsible for the wave of madness which has swept the mind of Christendom. No one can measure the consequences. I wondered whether those stupid Kings and Emperors could not assemble together and revivify kingship by saving the nations from hell but we all drift on in a kind of dull cataleptic trance. As if it was somebody else's operations.

— Winston Churchill to his wife, July 1914

Following the June 1914 assassination of Archduke Franz Ferdinand of Austria there was growing talk of war in Europe. Churchill began readying the navy for conflict. Although there was strong opposition within the Liberal Party to involvement in the conflict, the British Cabinet declared war when Germany invaded Belgium. Churchill was tasked with overseeing Britain's naval warfare effort. In two weeks, the navy transported 120,000 British troops across the English Channel to France. In August, he oversaw a naval blockade of German North Sea ports to prevent them from transporting food by sea; he also sent submarines to the Baltic Sea to assist the Russian Navy against German warships. Also in August, he sent the Marine Brigade to Ostend to force the Germans to reallocate some of their troops away from their main southward thrust.

In September, Churchill took over full responsibility for Britain's aerial defence, making several visits to France to oversee the war effort. While in Britain, he spoke at all-party recruiting rallies in London and Liverpool, and his wife gave birth to their third child, Sarah. In October he visited Antwerp to observe Belgian defences against the besieging Germans; he promised Belgian Prime Minister Charles de Broqueville that Britain would provide reinforcements for the city. The German assault continued, and shortly after Churchill left the city he agreed to a British retreat, allowing the Germans to take Antwerp; many in the press criticised Churchill for this. Churchill maintained that his actions prolonged the resistance, thus enabling the Allies to secure Calais and Dunkirk.

In November, Asquith called a War Council, consisting of himself, Lloyd George, Edward Grey, Kitchener, and Churchill. Churchill proposed a plan to seize the island of Borkum and use it as a post from which to attack Germany's northern coastline, believing that this strategy should shorten the war. Churchill also encouraged the development of the tank, which he believed would be useful in overcoming the problems of trench warfare, and financed its creation with admiralty funds. To relieve Turkish pressure on the Russians in the Caucasus, Churchill was part of a plan to distract the Turkish Army by attacking in the Dardanelles, with the hope that if successful the British could seize Constantinople. In March, a fleet of 13 battleships attacked in the Dardanelles but faced severe problems from submerged mines; in April, the 29th Division began its assault at Gallipoli. Many MPs, particularly Conservatives, blamed Churchill for the failure of these campaigns. Amid growing Conservative pressure, in May, Asquith agreed to form an all-party coalition government; the Conservatives' one condition of entry was that Churchill be demoted from his position at the Admiralty. Churchill pleaded his case with both Asquith and Conservative leader Bonar Law, but ultimately accepted his demotion to the position of Chancellor of the Duchy of Lancaster.

== Military service, 1915–1916 ==
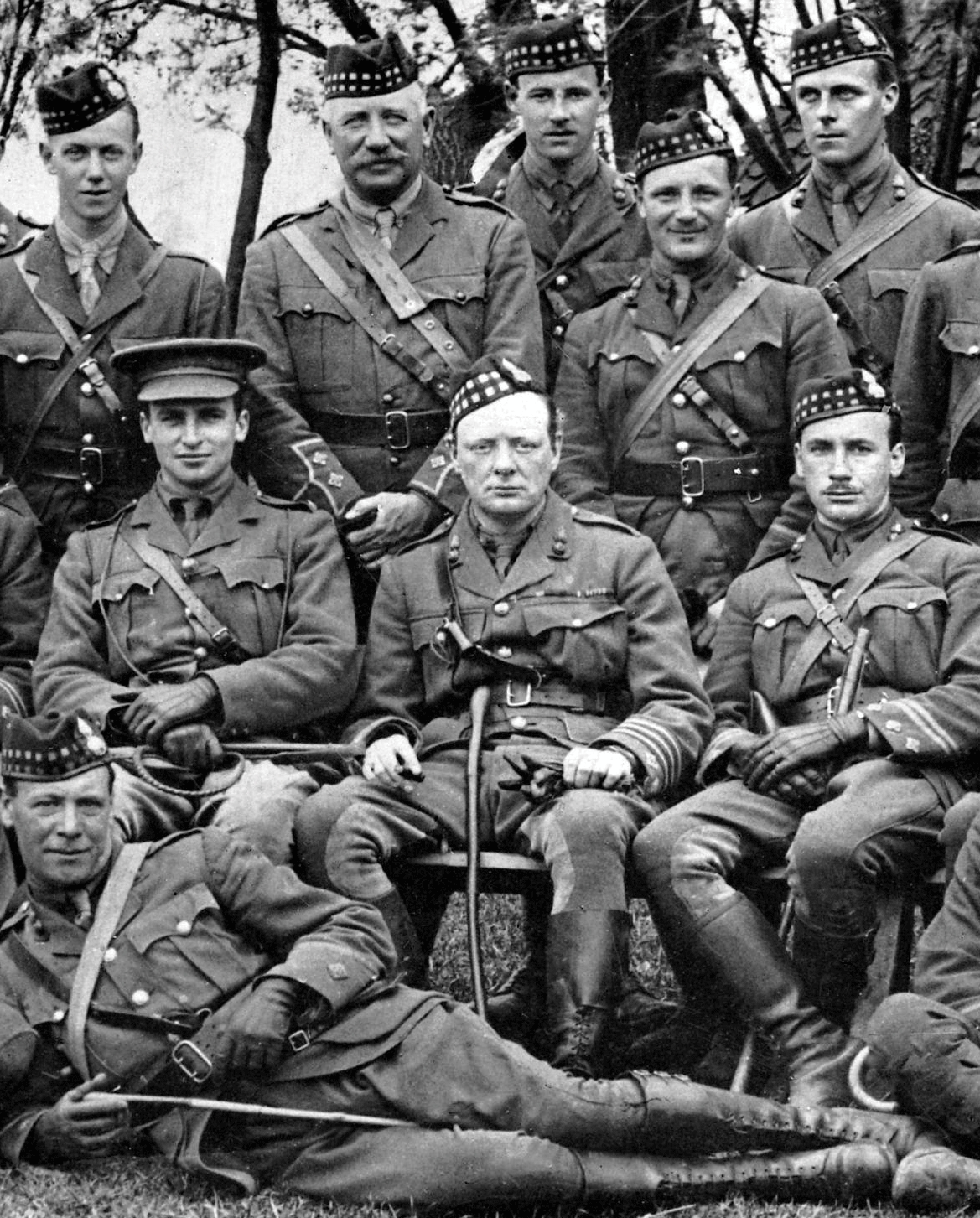
Churchill commanding the 6th Battalion, the Royal Scots Fusiliers, 1916. His second-in-command, Archibald Sinclair, is sitting on his right.

In November 1915, Churchill resigned from the government, although he remained an MP; Asquith rejected his request to be appointed Governor-General of British East Africa. Moving into his brother's home in South Kensington, he and his family spent weekends at a Tudor farmhouse near Godalming, where he took up painting, which became a lifelong hobby.

In November Churchill joined the 2nd Battalion, Grenadier Guards, on the Western Front. After a brief trip back to London for Christmas, in January 1916 he was promoted temporarily to lieutenant-colonel and placed in command of the 6th Battalion, Royal Scots Fusiliers. After a period of training, the Battalion was moved to a sector of the Front near Ploegsteert in Belgium. Churchill spent three and a half months at the Front; his Battalion faced continual shelling although no German offensive. He narrowly escaped death when, during a visit by his staff officer cousin the 9th Duke of Marlborough, a large piece of shrapnel fell between them. In March he returned home briefly, making a speech on naval issues to the House of Commons. In May, the 6th Royal Scots Fusiliers were merged into the 15th Division. Churchill did not request a new command, instead securing permission to leave active service. His temporary promotion ended on 16 May, when he returned to the rank of major.

Back in the House of Commons, Churchill spoke out on war issues, calling for conscription to be extended to the Irish, greater recognition of soldiers' bravery, and for the introduction of steel helmets for troops. He nevertheless was frustrated that there was little for him to do. The failure of the Dardanelles hung over him, with the issue repeatedly being raised by the Conservatives and pro-Conservative press. He argued his case before the Dardanelles Commission, whose published report placed no blame on him for the campaign's failure.

== Lloyd George government: 1916–1922 ==
=== Minister of Munitions: 1917–1919 ===
Asquith resigned and Lloyd George became Prime Minister in October 1916; in May 1917, the latter sent Churchill to inspect the French war effort. In July, Lloyd George appointed Churchill Minister of Munitions. In this position, Churchill made a commitment to increase munitions production, streamlined the organisation of the department, and soon negotiated an end to a strike in munitions factories along the Clyde. He ended a second strike, in June 1918, by threatening to conscript strikers into the army. He made repeated trips to France, visiting the Front and meeting with French political leaders, including its Prime Minister, Georges Clemenceau. In the House of Commons, he voted in support of the Representation of the People Act 1918, which first gave some British women the right to vote. Following British military gains, in November, Germany surrendered. Four days later, Churchill's fourth child, Marigold, was born.

=== Secretary of State for War and Air: 1919–1921 ===
After the war, Lloyd George called a new election. During the election campaign, Churchill called for the nationalisation of the railways, a control on monopolies, tax reform, and the creation of a League of Nations to prevent future wars. In the election, Churchill was returned as MP for Dundee and Lloyd George retained as Prime Minister. In January 1919, Lloyd George then moved Churchill to the War Office as both Secretary of State for War and Secretary of State for Air.

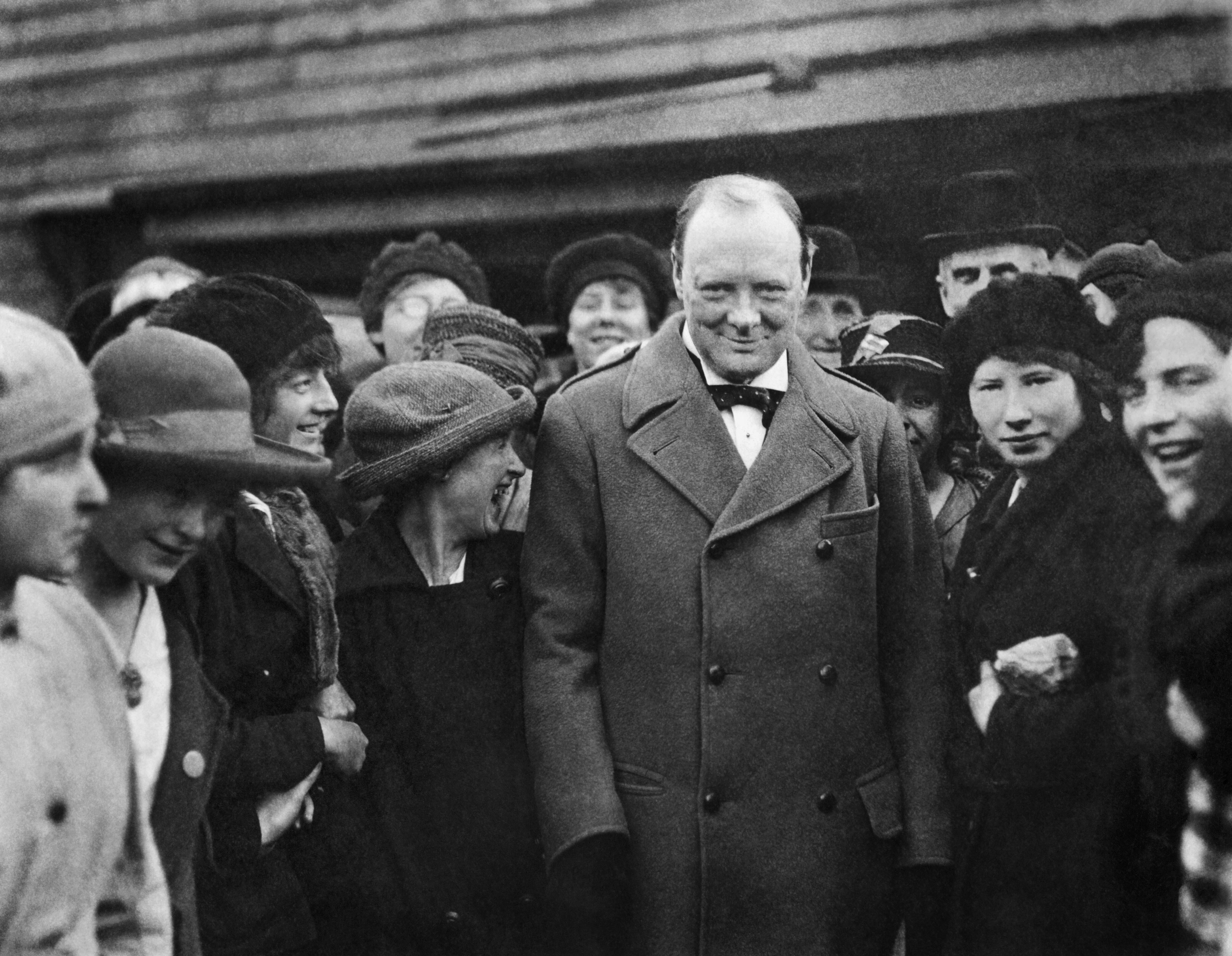
Churchill meets female workers at Georgetown's filling works near Glasgow in October 1918.

Churchill was responsible for demobilising the British Army, although he convinced Lloyd George to keep a million men conscripted to use as a British Army of the Rhine. Churchill was one of the few government figures who opposed harsh measures against the defeated Germany. He stated that he opposed any punitive measures that would reduce "the mass of the working-class population of Germany to a condition of sweated labour and servitude". He also cautioned against demobilising the German Army, warning that they may be needed as a bulwark against threats from the newly established Soviet Russia.

Churchill was an outspoken opponent of Vladimir Lenin's new Communist Party government in Russia, stating that "of all the tyrannies in history, the Bolshevik tyranny is the worst". British troops were already in parts of the former Russian Empire, assisting the anti-Communist White forces amid the ongoing Russian Civil War. On 27 August 1919, British aerial attacks began on the village of Emtsa, using a weapon called the "M Device", an exploding shell with a toxic gas known as diphenylaminechlorarsine. The attacks continued into September on the villages of Chunova, Vikhtova, Pocha, Chorga, Tavoigor, and Zapolki.

Although initially committed to British involvement, Churchill concluded there was insufficient British desire for another war, and convinced Lloyd George to bring the British troops home, albeit continuing to provide the Whites with arms and supplies. In his words, "if Russia is to be saved [from the Communists], as I pray she may be saved, she must be saved by Russians", not by foreign troops. He took responsibility for evacuating the 14,000 British troops from Russia. After the Soviets won the civil war, Churchill proposed a cordon sanitaire around the country.

Churchill's attentions were also turned to the Irish War of Independence, where he supported the use of the para-military Black and Tans to combat Irish revolutionaries. After British troops in Iraq clashed with Kurdish rebels, Churchill authorised two squadrons to the area, proposing that they be equipped with mustard gas to use against the rebels. More broadly, he saw the occupation of Iraq as a drain on Britain and proposed, unsuccessfully, that the government should hand control of central and northern Iraq back to Turkey.

=== Secretary of State for the Colonies: 1921–1922 ===
Churchill became Secretary of State for the Colonies in February 1921. The following month, the first exhibit of his paintings was held; it took place in Paris, with Churchill exhibiting under a pseudonym. In May, his mother died, followed in August by his daughter Marigold. A key issue that year was the ongoing Irish War of Independence. To end it, Churchill pushed for a truce, which came into effect in July. In October, he was among the seven British negotiators who met Sinn Féin leaders in Downing Street. He suggested Ireland be given home rule within the Empire but with the six Protestant-majority counties of Ulster having some autonomy from a Dublin government: the Ulster Unionists rejected this. It was then agreed that Ireland would be partitioned; most of the country would form the Irish Free State, while the Protestant-majority areas would form Northern Ireland and remain part of the UK. This was written into the Anglo-Irish Treaty, which Churchill helped draft. After the treaty, Churchill successfully called for Sinn Féin members who were guilty of murder to have their death penalties waived. As Ireland descended into civil war between supporters and republican opponents of the treaty, Churchill supplied weapons to the forces of Michael Collins' pro-treaty government.

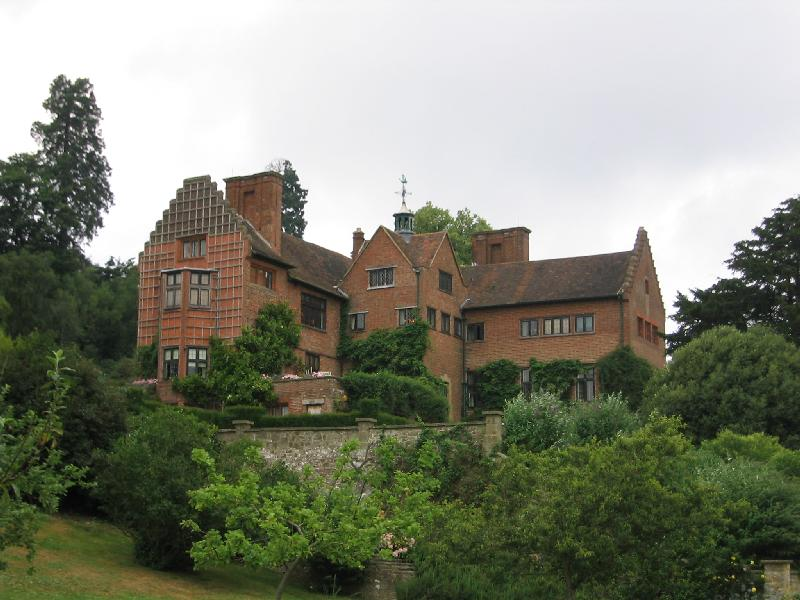
Churchill's main home was Chartwell in Kent. He purchased it in 1922 after his daughter Mary was born.

Churchill was responsible for reducing the cost of occupying the Middle East. He urged removing most British troops from Iraq and installing an Arab government. In March he met British officials responsible for governing Iraq in Cairo. They agreed to install Faisal as King of Iraq and his brother, Abdullah, as King of Transjordan. From there he travelled to Mandatory Palestine, where Arab Palestinians petitioned him not to allow further Jewish migration. A supporter of Zionism, he dismissed this. Churchill believed that he could encourage Jewish migration to Palestine while allaying Arab fears that they would become a dominated minority. Only following the 1921 Jaffa riots did he agree to temporary restrictions on Jewish migration to Palestine. With Turkey seeking to expand into areas lost during the First World War, Churchill backed Lloyd George in holding British control of Constantinople. Turkish troops advanced towards the British, leading to the Chanak Crisis, with Churchill calling on British troops to stay firm.

In late 1921 Lloyd George made Churchill chair of a Cabinet Committee on Defence Estimates, which met in January 1922 to determine how much military expenditure could be cut without jeopardising national security. In December 1921 he holidayed in the south of France, where he began writing a book about his experiences during the First World War. In September 1922 his fifth child, Mary, was born, and that month he purchased a new house, Chartwell, in Kent. In October 1922 Churchill underwent an operation for appendicitis. While this was occurring, the Conservatives withdrew from Lloyd George's coalition government, precipitating the November 1922 general election, in which Churchill lost his Dundee seat to prohibitionist Edwin Scrymgeour, coming fourth in terms of vote share.

== Out of Parliament: 1922–1924 ==
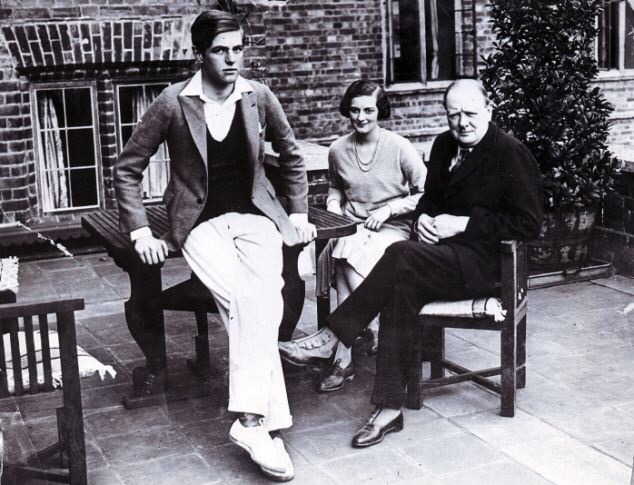
Churchill with children Randolph and Diana in 1923.

Churchill spent the next six months largely at the Villa Rêve d'Or near Cannes, where he devoted himself to painting and writing his memoirs. He produced a five-volume series of books about the war, its build-up, and its aftermath, titled The World Crisis; the first volume appeared in April 1923 and the others over the course of ten years. After a 1923 general election was called, seven Liberal associations asked Churchill to stand as their candidate, and he selected that at Leicester West. He did not win the seat. A Labour government led by Ramsay MacDonald took power, although Churchill had hoped they would be kept out of office by a coalition of the Conservatives and Liberals. He strongly opposed the MacDonald government's decision to loan money to Soviet Russia and feared the signing of an Anglo-Soviet Treaty.

In 1924, Churchill stood as an independent candidate in the Westminster Abbey by-election but was defeated. In May he then addressed a Conservative meeting in Liverpool—the first time he had spoken to a Conservative group for twenty years—in which he declared that there was no longer a place for the Liberal Party in British politics and that Liberals must therefore back the Conservatives to stop Labour and ensure "the successful defeat of Socialism". In July, he agreed with Conservative leader Stanley Baldwin that he would be selected as the Conservative candidate for a seat—in September he was chosen for Epping—but that he did not have to stand under the Conservative banner, instead describing himself as a "Constitutionalist". The general election occurred in October, with Churchill winning in Epping. The Conservatives were victorious, with Baldwin forming the new government. Although Churchill had no background in finance or economics, Baldwin appointed him as Chancellor of the Exchequer on 6 November 1924. Churchill moved into 11 Downing Street and formally rejoined the Conservative Party.
