= Liberal Party (UK) =

British political party (1859–1988)

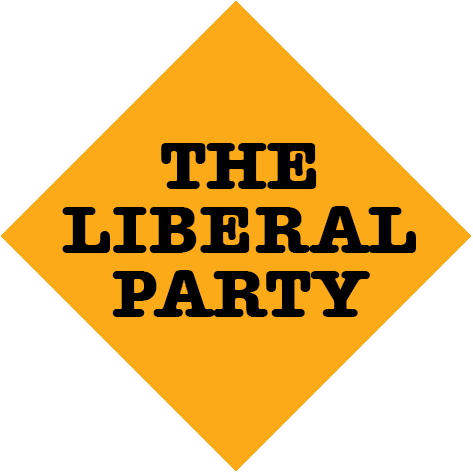
- Founder: John Russell, 1st Earl Russell
- Founded: 9 June 1859
- Dissolved: 2 March 1988
- Merger of: Whigs; Radicals; Peelites; Independent Irish Party
- Merged into: Liberal Democrats
- Headquarters: Offices at the National Liberal Club, 1 Whitehall Place, London
- Youth wing: National League of Young Liberals
- Ideology: Liberalism (British); 1859–1906: Classical liberalism; Gladstonian liberalism; 1906–1988: Social liberalism
- Political position: Centre
- National affiliation: SDP–Liberal Alliance (1981–1988)
- European affiliation: Federation of European Liberal Democrats (1976–1988)
- European Parliament group: Liberals and Allies Group (1973–1976); Liberal and Democratic Group (1976–1979)
- International affiliation: Radical International (1923–1938); Liberal International (1947–1988)
- Northern Irish affiliate: Ulster Liberal Party (1956–1987)
- Colours: Orange (official); Yellow (customary)
- Anthem: "The Land"
- Conference: Liberal Assembly

The Liberal Party was one of the two major political parties in the United Kingdom, along with the Conservative Party, in the 19th and early 20th centuries. Beginning as an alliance of Whigs, free trade-supporting Peelites, and reformist Radicals in the 1850s, by the end of the 19th century, it had formed four governments under William Ewart Gladstone. Despite being divided over the issue of Irish Home Rule, the party returned to government in 1905 and won a landslide victory in the 1906 general election. Under prime ministers Henry Campbell-Bannerman (1905–1908) and H. H. Asquith (1908–1916), the Liberal Party passed reforms that created a basic welfare state. Although Asquith was the party leader, its dominant figure was David Lloyd George.

Asquith was overwhelmed by his wartime role as prime minister and Lloyd George led a coalition that replaced him in late 1916. However, Asquith remained as Liberal Party leader. The split between Lloyd George's breakaway faction and Asquith's official Liberal faction badly weakened the party. The coalition government of Lloyd George was increasingly dominated by the Conservative Party, which finally ousted him as prime minister in 1922. The subsequent Liberal collapse was quick and catastrophic. With 397 MPs elected in the 1906 election; they had only 40 in 1924. Their share of the popular vote plunged from 49% to 18%. The Labour Party absorbed most of the ex-Liberal voters and then became the Conservatives' main rival.

By the 1950s, the party had won as few as six seats at general elections. Apart from a few notable by-election victories, its fortunes did not improve significantly until it formed the SDP–Liberal Alliance with the newly formed Social Democratic Party (SDP) in 1981. At the 1983 general election, the Alliance won over a quarter of the vote, but won only 23 of the 633 seats it contested. At the 1987 general election, its share of the vote fell below 23%. Further, the Liberals and the SDP merged in 1988 to form the Social and Liberal Democrats (SLD), who the following year were renamed the Liberal Democrats. A splinter group reconstituted the Liberal Party in 1989.

The Liberals were a coalition with diverse positions on major issues and no unified national policy. This made them repeatedly liable to deep splits, such as that of the Liberal Unionists in 1886 (they eventually joined the Conservative Party); the faction of labour union members that joined the new Labour Party; the split between factions led by Asquith and that led by Lloyd George in 1918–1922; and a three-way split in 1931. Many prominent intellectuals were active in the party, including philosopher John Stuart Mill, economist John Maynard Keynes, and social planner William Beveridge. Winston Churchill during his years as a Liberal (1904–1924) authored Liberalism and the Social Problem (1909).

== History ==
=== Origins ===
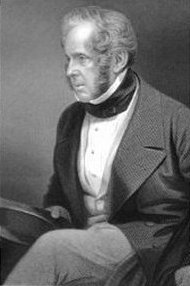
Viscount Palmerston

The Liberal Party grew out of the Whigs, whose ideology is rooted in the Parliamentarian faction of the English Civil War, and as a political party originates from the aristocratic faction in the reign of Charles II and the early 19th century Radicals. The Whigs were in favour of reducing the power of the Crown and increasing the power of Parliament. Although their motives in this were originally to gain more power for themselves, the more idealistic Whigs gradually came to support an expansion of democracy for its own sake. The great figures of reformist Whiggery were Charles James Fox (died 1806) and his disciple and successor Earl Grey. After decades in opposition, the Whigs returned to power under Grey in 1830 and carried the First Reform Act in 1832.

The Reform Act was the climax of Whiggism, but it also brought about the Whigs' demise. The admission of the middle classes to the franchise and to the House of Commons led eventually to the development of a systematic middle-class liberalism and the end of Whiggery, although for many years reforming aristocrats held senior positions in the party. In the years after Grey's retirement, the party was led first by Lord Melbourne, a fairly traditional Whig, and then by Lord John Russell, the son of a Duke but a crusading radical, and by Lord Palmerston, a renegade Irish Tory and essentially a conservative, although capable of radical gestures.

As early as 1839, Russell had adopted the name of "Liberals"; in reality, his party was a loose coalition of Whigs in the House of Lords and Radicals in the Commons. The leading Radicals were John Bright and Richard Cobden, who represented the manufacturing towns which had gained representation under the Reform Act. They favoured social reform, personal liberty, reducing the powers of the Crown and the Church of England (many Liberals were Nonconformists), avoidance of war and foreign alliances (which were bad for business) and above all free trade. For a century, free trade remained the one cause which could unite all Liberals.

In 1841, the Liberals lost office to the Conservatives under Sir Robert Peel. However, their period in opposition was short because the Conservatives split over the repeal of the Corn Laws, a free trade issue; and a faction known as the Peelites (but not Peel himself, who died soon after) aligned to the Liberal side on the issue of free trade. This allowed ministries led by Russell, Palmerston and the Peelite Lord Aberdeen to hold office for most of the 1850s and 1860s. A leading Peelite was William Gladstone, who was a reforming Chancellor of the Exchequer in most of these governments. The formal foundation of the Liberal Party is traditionally traced to 1859 when the remaining Peelites, Radicals and Whigs agreed to vote down the incumbent Conservative government. This meeting was held at the Willis' rooms in London on 6 June 1859. This led to Palmerston's second government.

However, the Whig-Radical amalgam could not become a true modern political party while it was dominated by aristocrats and it was not until the departure of the "Two Terrible Old Men", Russell and Palmerston, that Gladstone could become the first leader of the modern Liberal Party. This was brought about by Palmerston's death in 1865 and Russell's retirement in 1868. After a brief Conservative government (during which the Second Reform Act was passed by agreement between the parties), Gladstone won a huge victory at the 1868 election and formed the first Liberal government. The establishment of the party as a national membership organisation came with the foundation of the National Liberal Federation in 1877. The philosopher John Stuart Mill was also a Liberal MP from 1865 to 1868.

=== Gladstone era ===
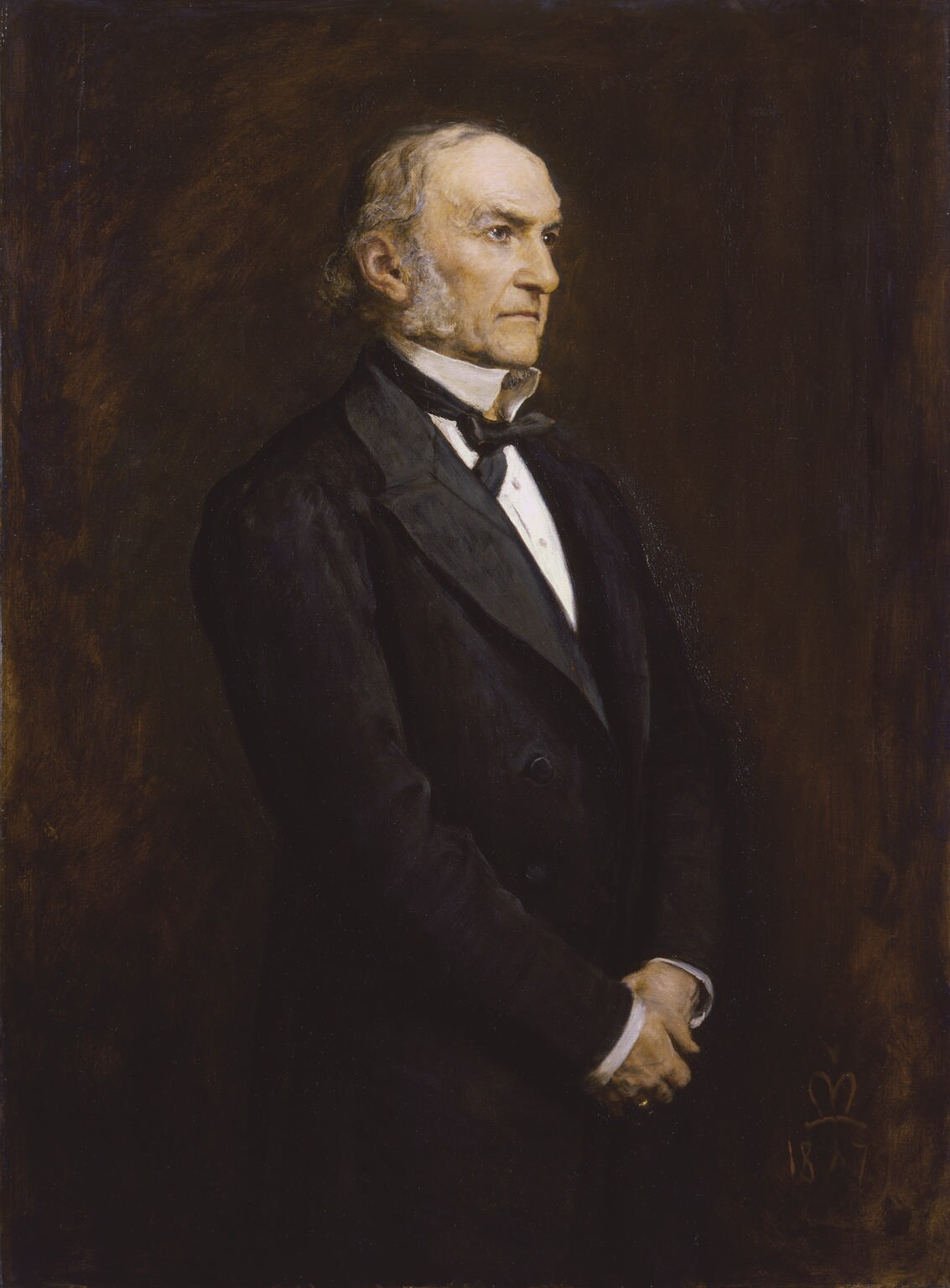
Portrait of William Ewart Gladstone by John Everett Millais, 1879

For the next 30 years, Gladstone and Liberalism were synonymous. William Gladstone served as prime minister four times (1868–74, 1880–85, 1886, and 1892–94). His financial policies, based on the notion of balanced budgets, low taxes and laissez-faire, were suited to a developing capitalist society, but they could not respond effectively as economic and social conditions changed. Called the "Grand Old Man" later in life, Gladstone was always a dynamic popular orator who appealed strongly to the working class and to the lower middle class. Deeply religious, Gladstone brought a new moral tone to politics, with his evangelical sensibility and his opposition to aristocracy. His moralism often angered his upper-class opponents (including Queen Victoria), and his heavy-handed control split the Liberal Party.

In foreign policy, Gladstone was in general against foreign entanglements, but he did not resist the realities of imperialism. For example, he ordered the occupation of Egypt by British forces in the 1882 Anglo-Egyptian War. His goal was to create a European order based on co-operation rather than conflict and on mutual trust instead of rivalry and suspicion; the rule of law was to supplant the reign of force and self-interest. This Gladstonian concept of a harmonious Concert of Europe was opposed to and ultimately defeated by a Bismarckian system of manipulated alliances and antagonisms.

As prime minister from 1868 to 1874, Gladstone headed a Liberal Party which was a coalition of Peelites like himself, Whigs and Radicals. He was now a spokesman for "peace, economy and reform". One major achievement was the Elementary Education Act 1870 (33 & 34 Vict. c. 75), which provided England with an adequate system of elementary schools for the first time. He also secured the abolition of the purchase of commissions in the British Army and of religious tests for admission to Oxford and Cambridge; the introduction of the secret ballot in elections; the legalization of trade unions; and the reorganization of the judiciary in the Judicature Act.

Regarding Ireland, the major Liberal achievements were land reform, where he ended centuries of landlord oppression, and the disestablishment of the (Anglican) Church of Ireland through the Irish Church Act 1869.

In the 1874 general election, Gladstone was defeated by the Conservatives under Benjamin Disraeli during a sharp economic recession. He formally resigned as Liberal leader and was succeeded by the Marquess of Hartington, but he soon changed his mind and returned to active politics. He strongly disagreed with Disraeli's pro-Ottoman foreign policy and in 1880 he conducted the first outdoor mass-election campaign in Britain, known as the Midlothian campaign. The Liberals won a large majority in the 1880 election. Hartington ceded his place and Gladstone resumed office.

==== Ireland and Home Rule ====
Among the consequences of the Third Reform Act (1884) was the giving of the vote to many Irish Catholics. In the 1885 general election the Irish Parliamentary Party held the balance of power in the House of Commons and demanded Irish Home Rule as the price of support for a continued Gladstone ministry. Gladstone personally supported Home Rule, but a strong Liberal Unionist faction led by Joseph Chamberlain, along with the last of the Whigs, Hartington, opposed it. The Irish Home Rule bill proposed to offer all owners of Irish land a chance to sell to the state at a price equal to 20 years' purchase of the rents and allowing tenants to purchase the land. Irish nationalist reaction was mixed, Unionist opinion was hostile, and the election addresses during the 1886 election revealed English radicals to be against the bill also. Among the Liberal rank and file, several Gladstonian candidates disowned the bill, reflecting fears at the constituency level that the interests of the working people were being sacrificed to finance a costly rescue operation for the landed élite. Further, Home Rule had not been promised in the Liberals' election manifesto, and so the impression was given that Gladstone was buying Irish support in a rather desperate manner to hold on to power.

The result was a catastrophic split in the Liberal Party, and heavy defeat in the 1886 election at the hands of Lord Salisbury, who was supported by the breakaway Liberal Unionist Party. There was a final weak Gladstone ministry in 1892, but it also was dependent on Irish support and failed to get Irish Home Rule through the House of Lords.

==== Newcastle Programme ====
Historically, the aristocracy was divided between Conservatives and Liberals. However, when Gladstone committed to home rule for Ireland, Britain's upper classes largely abandoned the Liberal party, giving the Conservatives a large permanent majority in the House of Lords. Following the Queen, High Society in London largely ostracized home rulers and Liberal clubs were badly split. Joseph Chamberlain took a major element of upper-class supporters out of the Party and into a third party called Liberal Unionism on the Irish issue. It collaborated with and eventually merged into the Conservative party. The Gladstonian liberals in 1891 adopted The Newcastle Programme that included home rule for Ireland, disestablishment of the Church of England in Wales, tighter controls on the sale of liquor, major extension of factory regulation and various democratic political reforms. The Programme had a strong appeal to the nonconformist middle-class Liberal element, which felt liberated by the departure of the aristocracy.

==== Relations with trade unions ====
A major long-term consequence of the Third Reform Act was the rise of Lib-Lab candidates. The Act split all county constituencies (which were represented by multiple MPs) into single-member constituencies, roughly corresponding to population patterns. With the foundation of the Labour Party not to come till 1906, many trade unions allied themselves with the Liberals. In areas with working class majorities, in particular coal-mining areas, Lib-Lab candidates were popular, and they received sponsorship and endorsement from trade unions. In the first election after the Act was passed (1885), thirteen were elected, up from two in 1874. The Third Reform Act also facilitated the demise of the Whig old guard; in two-member constituencies, it was common to pair a Whig and a radical under the Liberal banner. After the Third Reform Act, fewer former Whigs were selected as candidates.

==== Reform policies ====
A broad range of interventionist reforms were introduced by the 1892–1895 Liberal government in areas such as housing, public health, and working conditions.

Historian Walter L. Arnstein concludes:

Notable as the Gladstonian reforms had been, they had almost all remained within the nineteenth-century Liberal tradition of gradually removing the religious, economic, and political barriers that prevented men of varied creeds and classes from exercising their individual talents in order to improve themselves and their society. As the third quarter of the century drew to a close, the essential bastions of Victorianism still held firm: respectability; a government of aristocrats and gentlemen now influenced not only by middle-class merchants and manufacturers but also by industrious working people; a prosperity that seemed to rest largely on the tenets of laissez-faire economics; and a Britannia that ruled the waves and many a dominion beyond.

=== After Gladstone ===
Gladstone finally retired in 1894. Gladstone's support for Home Rule deeply divided the party, and it lost its upper and upper-middle-class base, while keeping support among Protestant nonconformists and the Celtic fringe. Historian R. C. K. Ensor reports that after 1886, the main Liberal Party was deserted by practically the entire whig peerage and the great majority of the upper-class and upper-middle-class members. High prestige London clubs that had a Liberal base were deeply split. Ensor notes that, "London society, following the known views of the Queen, practically ostracized home rulers."

The new Liberal leader was the ineffectual Lord Rosebery. He led the party to a heavy defeat in the 1895 general election.

=== Liberal factions ===
The Liberal Party lacked a unified ideological base in 1906. It contained numerous contradictory and hostile factions, such as imperialists and supporters of the Boers; near-socialists and laissez-faire classical liberals; suffragettes and opponents of women's suffrage; antiwar elements and supporters of the military alliance with France. Nonconformists – Protestants outside the Anglican fold – were a powerful element, dedicated to opposing the established church in terms of education and taxation. However, the non-conformists were losing support amid society at large and played a lesser role in party affairs after 1900. The party, furthermore, also included Irish Catholics, and secularists from the labour movement. Many Conservatives (including Winston Churchill) had recently protested against high tariff moves by the Conservatives by switching to the anti-tariff Liberal camp, but it was unclear how many old Conservative traits they brought along, especially on military and naval issues.

The middle-class business, professional and intellectual communities were generally strongholds, although some old aristocratic families played important roles as well. The working-class element was moving rapidly toward the newly emerging Labour Party. One uniting element was widespread agreement on the use of politics and Parliament as a device to upgrade and improve society and to reform politics. All Liberals were outraged when Conservatives used their majority in the House of Lords to block reform legislation. In the House of Lords, the Liberals had lost most of their members, who in the 1890s "became Conservative in all but name." The government could force the unwilling king to create new Liberal peers, and that threat did prove decisive in the battle for dominance of Commons over Lords in 1911.

=== Rise of New Liberalism ===
The late nineteenth century saw the emergence of New Liberalism within the Liberal Party, which advocated state intervention as a means of guaranteeing freedom and removing obstacles to it such as poverty and unemployment. The policies of the New Liberalism are now known as social liberalism.

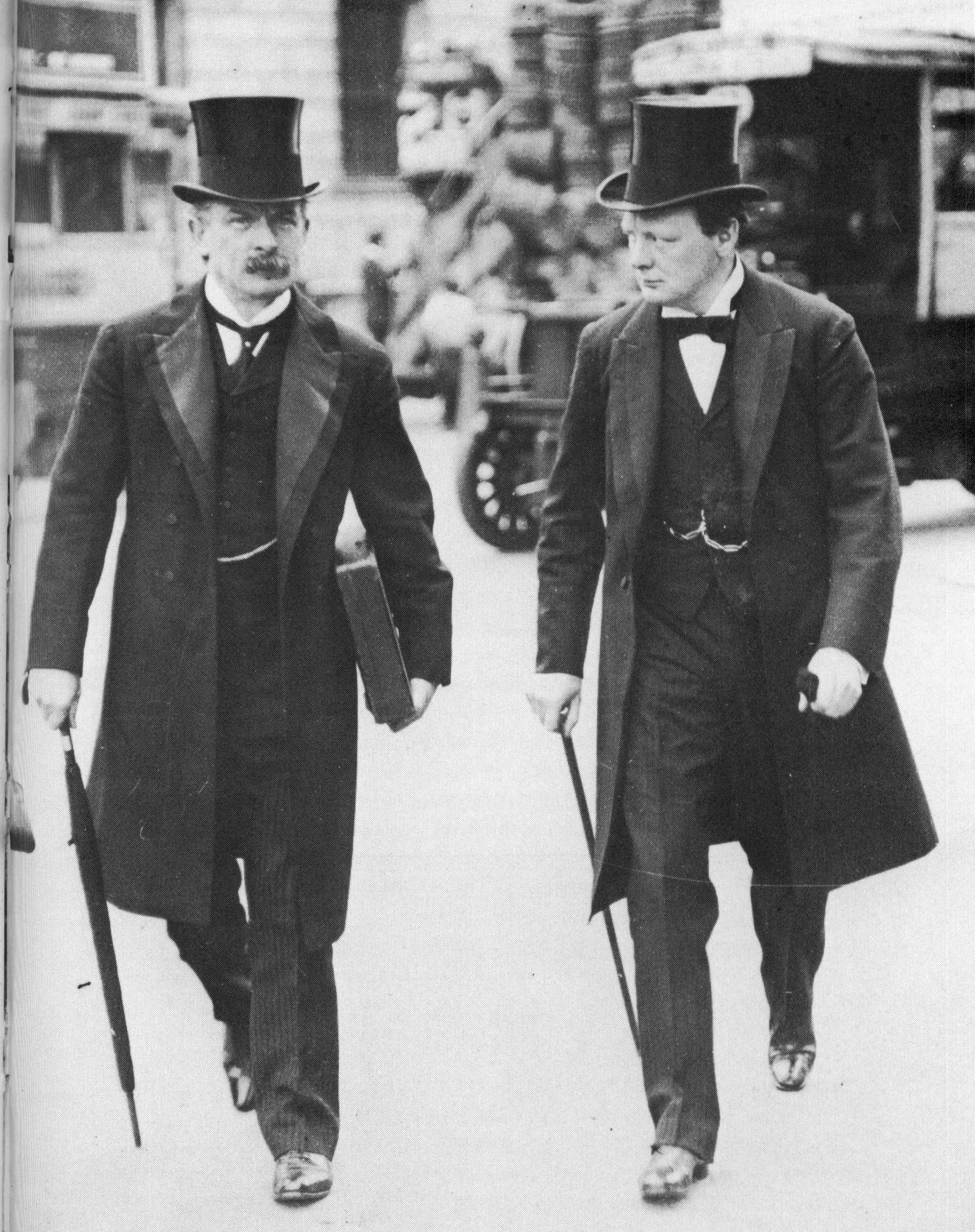
Liberal politicians David Lloyd George and Winston Churchill enacted the 1909 People's Budget which specifically aimed at the redistribution of wealth.

The New Liberals included intellectuals like L. T. Hobhouse, and John A. Hobson. They saw individual liberty as something achievable only under favourable social and economic circumstances. In their view, the poverty, squalor, and ignorance in which many people lived made it impossible for freedom and individuality to flourish. New Liberals believed that these conditions could be ameliorated only through collective action coordinated by a strong, welfare-oriented, and interventionist state.

Following the historic 1906 victory, the Liberal Party introduced multiple reforms on a range of issues, including health insurance, unemployment insurance, and pensions for elderly workers, thereby laying the groundwork for the future British welfare state. Some proposals failed, such as licensing fewer pubs, or rolling back Conservative educational policies. The People's Budget of 1909, championed by David Lloyd George and fellow Liberal Winston Churchill, introduced unprecedented taxes on the wealthy in Britain and radical social welfare programmes to the country's policies. In the Liberal camp, as noted by one study, "the Budget was on the whole enthusiastically received." It was the first budget with the expressed intent of redistributing wealth among the public. It imposed increased taxes on luxuries, liquor, tobacco, high incomes, and land – taxation that fell heavily on the rich. The new money was to be made available for new welfare programmes as well as new battleships. In 1911 Lloyd George succeeded in putting through Parliament his National Insurance Act, making provision for sickness and invalidism, and this was followed by his Unemployment Insurance Act.

Historian Peter Weiler argues:

Although still partially informed by older Liberal concerns for character, self-reliance, and the capitalist market, this legislation nevertheless, marked a significant shift in Liberal approaches to the state and social reform, approaches that later governments would slowly expand and that would grow into the welfare state after the Second World War. What was new in these reforms was the underlying assumption that the state could be a positive force, that the measure of individual freedom... was not how much the state left people alone, but whether it gave them the capacity to fill themselves as individuals.

Contrasting Old Liberalism with New Liberalism, David Lloyd George noted in a 1908 speech the following:

[Old Liberals] used the natural discontent of the people with the poverty and precariousness of the means of subsistence as a motive power to win for them a better, more influential, and more honourable status in the citizenship of their native land. The new Liberalism, while pursuing this great political ideal with unflinching energy, devotes a part of its endeavour also to the removing of the immediate causes of discontent. It is true that man cannot live by bread alone. It is equally true that a man cannot live without bread.

=== Liberal zenith ===
The results of the 1906 election

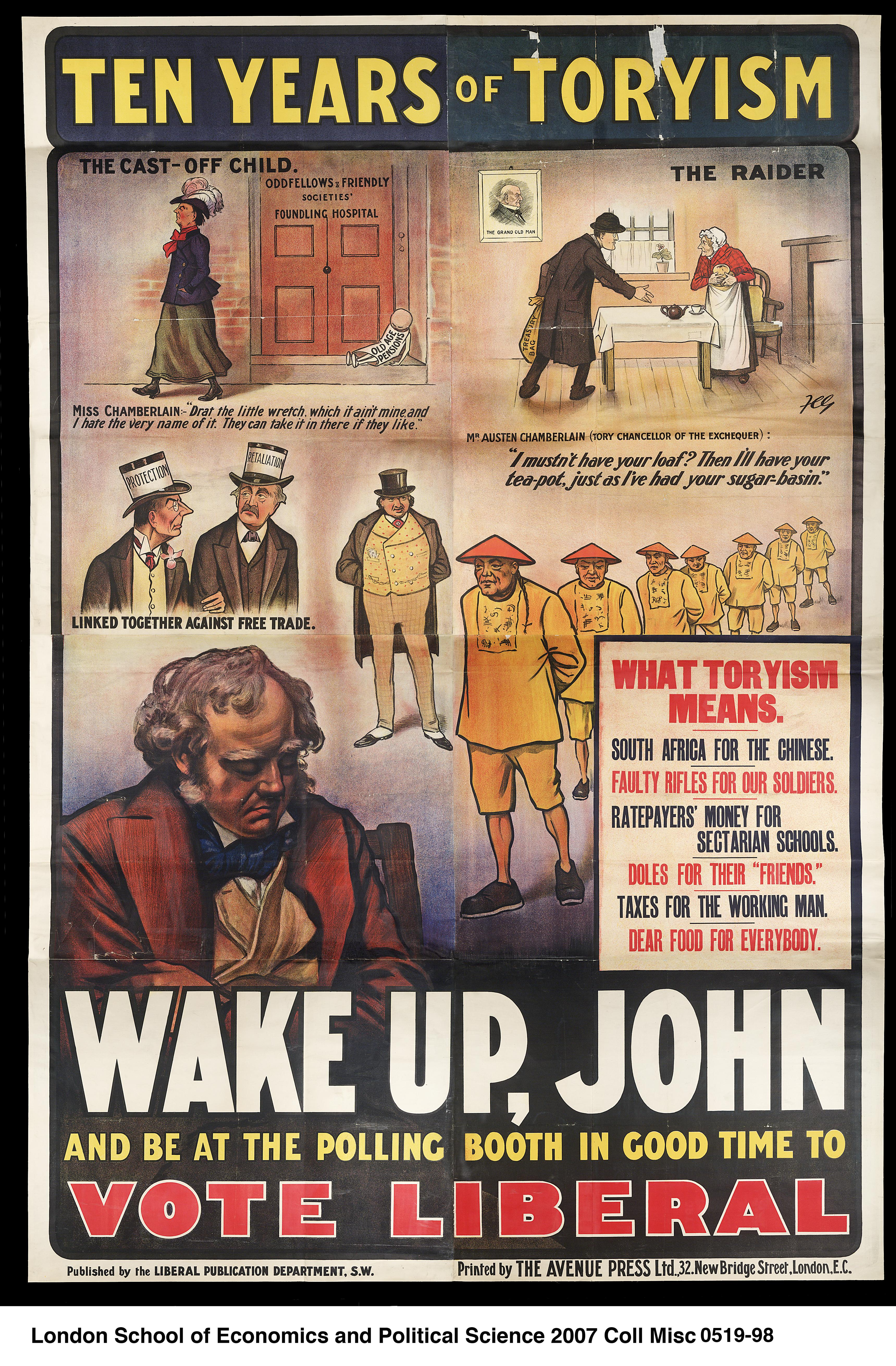
Liberal poster c. 1905–1910, clockwise from the left: Joseph Chamberlain (satirised as an unmarried mother leaving her baby at a Foundling hospital) abandons his commitment to old age pensions after failing to reach agreement with the Friendly Societies; Chancellor Austen Chamberlain threatens duties on consumer items which had been removed by Gladstone (in the picture on the wall); Chinese indentured labour in South Africa; John Bull contemplates his vote; and Joseph Chamberlain and Arthur Balfour (who favoured retaliatory tariffs) wearing top hats. The heading "ratepayers money for sectarian schools" refers to the Education Act 1902.

The Liberals languished in opposition for a decade while the coalition of Salisbury and Chamberlain held power. The 1890s were marred by infighting between the three principal successors to Gladstone, party leader William Harcourt, former prime minister Lord Rosebery, and Gladstone's personal secretary, John Morley. This intrigue finally led Harcourt and Morley to resign their positions in 1898 as they continued to be at loggerheads with Rosebery over Irish home rule and issues relating to imperialism. Replacing Harcourt as party leader was Sir Henry Campbell-Bannerman. Harcourt's resignation briefly muted the turmoil in the party, but the beginning of the Second Boer War soon nearly broke the party apart, with Rosebery and a circle of supporters including important future Liberal figures H. H. Asquith, Edward Grey and Richard Burdon Haldane forming a clique dubbed the Liberal Imperialists that supported the government in the prosecution of the war. On the other side, more radical members of the party formed a Pro-Boer faction that denounced the conflict and called for an immediate end to hostilities. Quickly rising to prominence among the Pro-Boers was David Lloyd George, a relatively new MP and a master of rhetoric, who took advantage of having a national stage to speak out on a controversial issue to make his name in the party. Harcourt and Morley also sided with this group, though with slightly different aims. Campbell-Bannerman tried to keep these forces together at the head of a moderate Liberal rump, but in 1901 he delivered a speech on the government's "methods of barbarism" in South Africa that pulled him further to the left and nearly tore the party in two. The party was saved after Salisbury's retirement in 1902 when his successor, Arthur Balfour, pushed a series of unpopular initiatives such as the Education Act 1902 and Joseph Chamberlain called for a new system of protectionist tariffs.

Campbell-Bannerman was able to rally the party around the traditional liberal platform of free trade and land reform and led them to the greatest election victory in their history. This would prove the last time the Liberals won a majority in their own right. Although he presided over a large majority, Sir Henry Campbell-Bannerman was overshadowed by his ministers, most notably H. H. Asquith at the Exchequer, Edward Grey at the Foreign Office, Richard Burdon Haldane at the War Office and David Lloyd George at the Board of Trade. Campbell-Bannerman retired in 1908 and died soon after. He was succeeded by Asquith, who stepped up the government's radicalism. Lloyd George succeeded Asquith at the Exchequer and was in turn succeeded at the Board of Trade by Winston Churchill, a recent defector from the Conservatives.

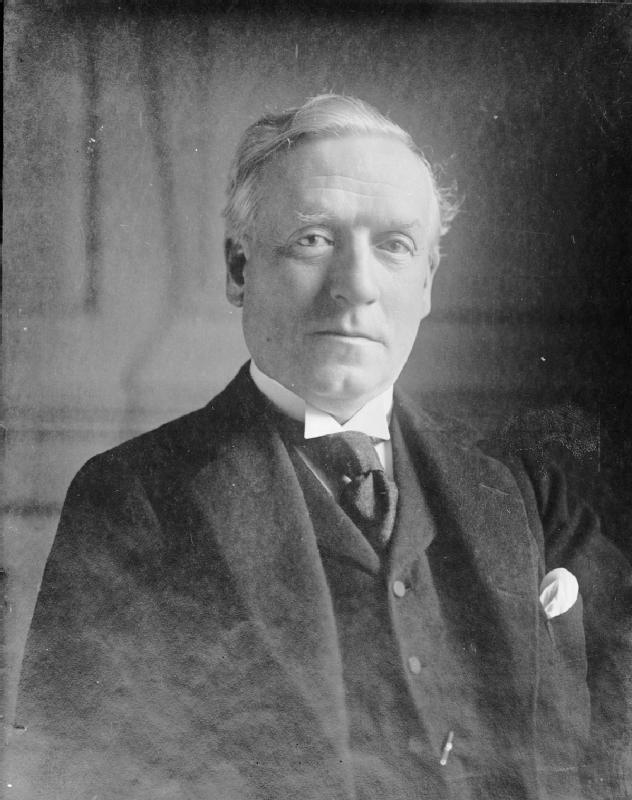
H. H. Asquith

The 1906 general election also represented a shift to the left by the Liberal Party. In the 1905/06 election campaign, nearly seven out of ten Liberal candidates mentioned social reform, which (as noted by one study) "usually included Poor Law reform and old age pensions." According to Rosemary Rees, almost half of the Liberal MPs elected in 1906 were supportive of New liberalism (ideology), while five-sixths of the Liberal party were described as left wing. Important junior offices were also held in the cabinet by what Duncan Tanner has termed "genuine New Liberals, Centrist reformers, and Fabian collectivists," and much legislation was pushed through by the Liberals in government. This included the regulation of working hours, National Insurance and welfare. One study has questioned the extent to which the Liberal Party experienced a leftward shift, estimating that only between 50 and 60 Liberal MPs out of the 400 in the parliamentary party after 1906 were Social Radicals, with a core of 20 to 30.

In a 1905 speech in Edinburgh, the Liberal politician Augustine Birrell made a reference to the leftward shift of his party, arguing (as noted by one study) "that Liberals at all levels were coming to accept" state intervention "on a large and national scale for the benefit the unsuccessful and for those who started life at grievous disadvantage."

Additionally, as one observer has noted:

The point is sometimes made that, in fact, the adoption by the Liberal Governments of 1905-14 of several major social welfare measures, including old-age pensions and health and unemployment insurance, provoked remarkably little resistance within the party. The measures that did occasion some overt resistance in the party were the Budgets for 1909 and 1914, which provided for the taxes to help finance new measures of reform as well as large increases in naval expenditure. It was, in other words, over the questions of the cost and financing of social reform that the main debate over social reform was waged within the Liberal Party.

Cartoonist John Bernard Partridge depicts Lloyd George as a giant with a cudgel labelled "Budget" in reference to his People's Budget while "a plutocrat" cowers beneath the table, Punch 28 April 1909. The caption, not shown, reads "Fee Fi Fo Phat, I smell the blood of a plutocrat. Be he alive or be he dead, I'll grind his bones to make my bread,"

A political battle erupted over the People's Budget, which was rejected by the House of Lords and for which the government obtained an electoral mandate at the January 1910 election. The election resulted in a hung parliament, with the government left dependent on the Irish Nationalists. Although the Lords now passed the budget, the government wished to curtail their power to block legislation. Asquith was required by King George V to fight a second general election in December 1910 (whose result was little changed from that in January) before he agreed, if necessary, to create hundreds of Liberals peers. Faced with that threat, the Lords voted to give up their veto power and allowed the passage of the Parliament Act 1911.

As the price of Irish support, Asquith was now forced to introduce a third Home Rule bill in 1912. Since the House of Lords no longer had the power to block the bill, but only to delay it for two years, it was due to become law in 1914. The Unionist Ulster Volunteers, led by Sir Edward Carson, launched a campaign of opposition that included the threat of a provisional government and armed resistance in Ulster. The Ulster Protestants had the full support of the Conservatives, whose leader, Bonar Law, was of Ulster-Scots descent. Government plans to deploy troops into Ulster had to be cancelled after the threat of mass resignation of their commissions by army officers in March 1914 (see Curragh Incident). Ireland seemed to be on the brink of civil war when the First World War broke out in August 1914. Asquith had offered the Six Counties (later to become Northern Ireland) an opt out from Home Rule for six years (i.e., until after two more general elections were likely to have taken place) but the Nationalists refused to agree to permanent Partition of Ireland. Historian George Dangerfield has argued that the multiplicity of crises in 1910 to 1914, political and industrial, so weakened the Liberal coalition before the war broke out that it marked the Strange Death of Liberal England. Political scientist Harold Webb Jr. also concludes that the combination of overambitious reforms, internal divisions and external political pressures set the stage for the Party's post-World War I fragmentation and decline. However, most historians date the collapse to the crisis of the First World War.

=== Decline ===
The Liberal Party might have survived a short war, but the totality of the Great War called for measures that the Party had long rejected. The result was the permanent destruction of the ability of the Liberal Party to lead a government. Historian Robert Blake explains the dilemma:

[T]he Liberals were traditionally the party of freedom of speech, conscience and trade. They were against jingoism, heavy armaments and compulsion. [...] Liberals were neither wholehearted nor unanimous about conscription, censorship, the Defence of the Realm Act, severity toward aliens and pacifists, direction of labour and industry. The Conservatives [...] had no such misgivings.

Blake further notes that it was the Liberals, not the Conservatives who needed the moral outrage of Belgium to justify going to war, while the Conservatives called for intervention from the start of the crisis on the grounds of realpolitik and the balance of power. However, Lloyd George and Churchill were zealous supporters of the war, and gradually forced the old peace-orientated Liberals out.

Asquith was blamed for the poor British performance in the first year. Since the Liberals ran the war without consulting the Conservatives, there were heavy partisan attacks. However, even Liberal commentators were dismayed by the lack of energy at the top. At the time, public opinion was intensely hostile, both in the media and in the street, against any young man in civilian garb and labeled as a slacker. The leading Liberal newspaper, the Manchester Guardian complained:

The fact that the Government has not dared to challenge the nation to rise above itself, is one among many signs. [...] The war is, in fact, not being taken seriously. [...] How can any slacker be blamed when the Government itself is slack.

Asquith's Liberal government was brought down in May 1915, due in particular to a crisis in inadequate artillery shell production and the protest resignation of Admiral Fisher over the disastrous Gallipoli Campaign against Turkey. Reluctant to face doom in an election, Asquith formed a new coalition government on 25 May, with the majority of the new cabinet coming from his own Liberal party and the Unionist (Conservative) party, along with a token Labour representation. The new government lasted a year and a half and was the last time Liberals controlled the government. The analysis of historian A. J. P. Taylor is that the British people were so deeply divided over numerous issues, but on all sides, there was growing distrust of the Asquith government. There was no agreement whatsoever on wartime issues. The leaders of the two parties realized that embittered debates in Parliament would further undermine popular morale and so the House of Commons did not once discuss the war before May 1915. Taylor argues:

The Unionists, by and large, regarded Germany as a dangerous rival, and rejoiced at the chance to destroy her. They meant to fight a hard-headed war by ruthless methods; they condemned Liberal 'softness' before the war and now. The Liberals insisted on remaining high-minded. Many of them had come to support the war only when the Germans invaded Belgium. [...] Entering the war for idealistic motives, the Liberals wished to fight it by noble means and found it harder to abandon their principles than to endure defeat in the field.

The 1915 coalition fell apart at the end of 1916, when the Conservatives withdrew their support from Asquith and gave it instead to Lloyd George, who became prime minister at the head of a new coalition largely made up of Conservatives. Asquith and his followers moved to the opposition benches in Parliament and the Liberal Party was deeply split once again.

=== Lloyd George as a Liberal heading a Conservative coalition ===
Lloyd George remained a Liberal all his life, but he abandoned many standard Liberal principles in his crusade to win the war at all costs. He insisted on strong government controls over business as opposed to the laissez-faire attitudes of traditional Liberals. In 1915–16 he had insisted on conscription of young men into the Army, a position that deeply troubled his old colleagues. That brought him and a few like-minded Liberals into the new coalition on the ground long occupied by Conservatives. There was no more planning for world peace or liberal treatment of Germany, nor discomfit with aggressive and authoritarian measures of state power. More deadly to the future of the party, says historian Trevor Wilson, was its repudiation by ideological Liberals, who decided sadly that it no longer represented their principles. Finally, the presence of the vigorous new Labour Party on the left gave a new home to voters disenchanted with the Liberal performance.

The last majority Liberal Government in Britain was elected in 1906. The years preceding the First World War were marked by worker strikes and civil unrest and saw many violent confrontations between civilians and the police and armed forces. Other issues of the period included women's suffrage and the Irish Home Rule movement. After the carnage of 1914–1918, the democratic reforms of the Representation of the People Act 1918 instantly tripled the number of people entitled to vote in Britain from seven to twenty-one million. The Labour Party benefited most from this huge change in the electorate, forming its first minority government in 1924.

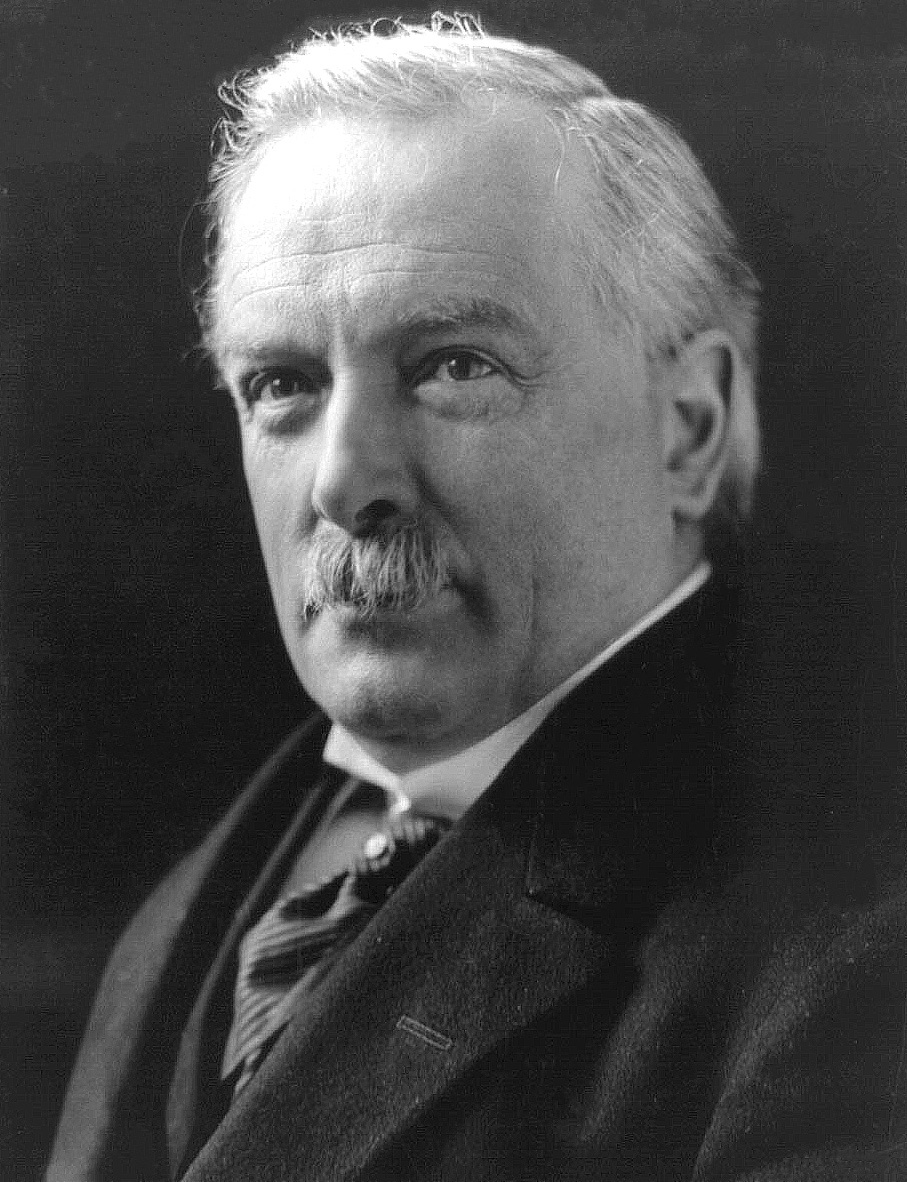
David Lloyd George

In the 1918 general election, Lloyd George, hailed as "the Man Who Won the War", led his coalition into a khaki election. Lloyd George and the Conservative leader Bonar Law wrote a joint letter of support to candidates to indicate they were considered the official Coalition candidates—this "coupon", as it became known, was issued against many sitting Liberal MPs, often to devastating effect, though not against Asquith himself. The coalition won a massive victory: Labour increased their position slightly, but the Asquithian Liberals were decimated. Those remaining Liberal MPs who were opposed to the Coalition Government went into opposition under the parliamentary leadership of Sir Donald MacLean who also became Leader of the Opposition. Asquith, who had appointed MacLean, remained as overall Leader of the Liberal Party even though he lost his seat in 1918. Asquith returned to Parliament in 1920 and resumed leadership. Between 1919 and 1923, the anti-Lloyd George Liberals were called Asquithian Liberals, Wee Free Liberals or Independent Liberals.

Lloyd George was increasingly under the influence of the rejuvenated Conservative party who numerically dominated the coalition. In 1922, the Conservative backbenchers rebelled against the continuation of the coalition, citing, in particular, Lloyd George's plan for war with Turkey in the Chanak Crisis, and his corrupt sale of honours. He resigned as prime minister and was succeeded by Bonar Law.

At the 1922 and 1923 elections, the Liberals won barely a third of the vote and only a quarter of the seats in the House of Commons as many radical voters abandoned the divided Liberals and went over to Labour. In 1922, Labour became the official opposition. A reunion of the two warring factions took place in 1923 when the new Conservative prime minister Stanley Baldwin committed his party to protective tariffs, causing the Liberals to reunite in support of free trade. The party gained ground in the 1923 general election but made most of its gains from Conservatives whilst losing ground to Labour—a sign of the party's direction for many years to come. The party remained the third largest in the House of Commons, but the Conservatives had lost their majority. There was much speculation and fear [by whom?] about the prospect of a Labour government and comparatively little about a Liberal government, even though it could have plausibly presented an experienced team of ministers compared to Labour's almost complete lack of experience as well as offering a middle ground that could obtain support from both Conservatives and Labour in crucial Commons divisions. However, instead of trying to force the opportunity to form a Liberal government, Asquith decided instead to allow Labour the chance of office in the belief that they would prove incompetent, and this would set the stage for a revival of Liberal fortunes at Labour's expense, but it was a fatal error.

Share of the vote received by Conservatives (blue), Whigs/Liberals/Liberal Democrats (orange), Labour (red) and others (grey) in general elections since 1832 shows that following success as the successor to the Whig party, the party's share of the popular vote plummeted after the First World War as it lost votes to the new Labour party and fractured into groups such as the National and Coalition Liberals

Labour was determined to destroy the Liberals and become the sole party of the left. Ramsay MacDonald was forced into a snap election in 1924 and although his government was defeated, he achieved his objective of virtually wiping the Liberals out as many more radical voters now moved to Labour whilst moderate middle-class Liberal voters concerned about socialism moved to the Conservatives. The Liberals were reduced to a mere forty seats in Parliament, only seven of which had been won against candidates from both parties and none of these formed a coherent area of Liberal survival. The party seemed finished, and during this period some Liberals, such as Churchill, went over to the Conservatives while others went over to Labour. Several Labour ministers of later generations, such as Michael Foot and Tony Benn, were the sons of Liberal MPs.

Asquith finally resigned as Liberal leader in 1926 (he died in 1928). Lloyd George, now party leader, began a drive to produce coherent policies on many key issues of the day. In the 1929 general election, he made a final bid to return the Liberals to the political mainstream, with an ambitious programme of state stimulation of the economy called We Can Conquer Unemployment!, largely written for him by the Liberal economist John Maynard Keynes. The Liberal Party stood in Northern Ireland for the first and only time in the 1929 general election, gaining 17% of the vote, but won no seats. Nationally the Liberals gained ground, but once again it was at the Conservatives' expense whilst also losing seats to Labour. Indeed, the urban areas of the country suffering heavily from unemployment, which might have been expected to respond the most to the radical economic policies of the Liberals, instead gave the party its worst results. By contrast, most of the party's seats were won either due to the absence of a candidate from one of the other parties or in rural areas on the Celtic fringe, where local evidence suggests that economic ideas were at best peripheral to the electorate's concerns. The Liberals now found themselves with 59 members, holding the balance of power in a Parliament where Labour was the largest party but lacked an overall majority. Lloyd George offered a degree of support to the Labour government in the hope of winning concessions, including a degree of electoral reform to introduce the alternative vote, but this support was to prove bitterly divisive as the Liberals increasingly divided between those seeking to gain what Liberal goals they could achieve, those who preferred a Conservative government to a Labour one and vice versa.

=== Splits over the National Government ===
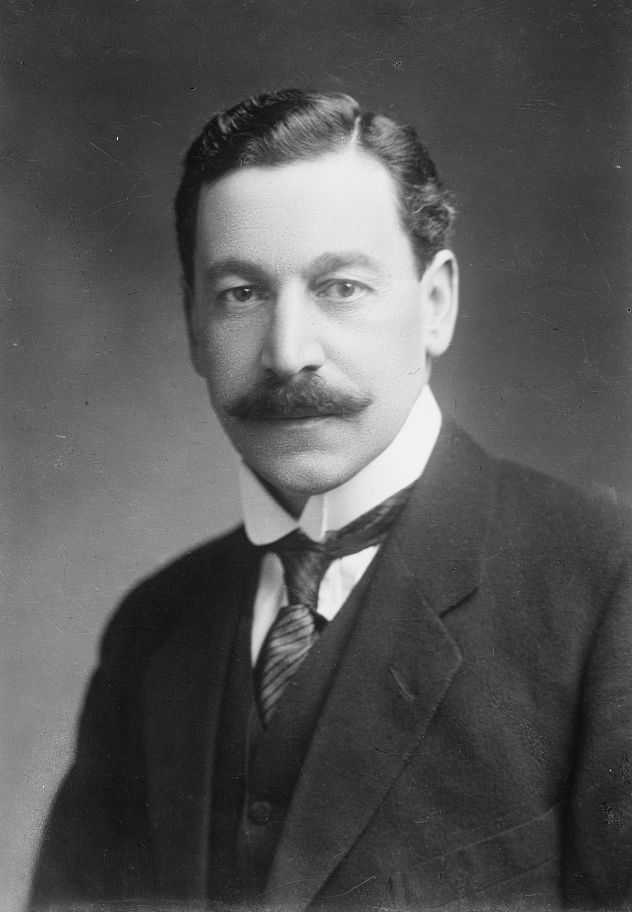
Herbert Samuel

A group of Liberal MPs led by Sir John Simon opposed the Liberal Party's support for the minority Labour government. They preferred to reach an accommodation with the Conservatives. In 1931 MacDonald's Labour government fell apart in response to the Great Depression. Macdonald agreed to lead a National Government of all parties, which passed a budget to deal with the financial crisis. When few Labour MPs backed the National government, it became clear that the Conservatives had the clear majority of government supporters. They then forced MacDonald to call a general election. Lloyd George called for the party to leave the National Government but only a few MPs and candidates followed. The majority, led by Sir Herbert Samuel, decided to contest the elections as part of the government. The bulk of Liberal MPs supported the government – the Liberal Nationals (officially the "National Liberals" after 1947) led by Simon, also known as "Simonites", and the "Samuelites" or "official Liberals", led by Samuel who remained as the official party. Both groups secured about 34 MPs but proceeded to diverge even further after the election, with the Liberal Nationals remaining supporters of the government throughout its life. There were to be a succession of discussions about them rejoining the Liberals, but these usually foundered on the issues of free trade and continued support for the National Government. The one significant reunification came in 1946 when the Liberal and Liberal National party organisations in London merged. The National Liberals, as they were called by then, were gradually absorbed into the Conservative Party, finally merging in 1968.

The official Liberals found themselves a tiny minority within a government committed to protectionism. Slowly they found this issue to be one they could not support. In early 1932 it was agreed to suspend the principle of collective responsibility to allow the Liberals to oppose the introduction of tariffs. Later in 1932 the Liberals resigned their ministerial posts over the introduction of the Ottawa Agreement on Imperial Preference. However, they remained sitting on the government benches supporting it in Parliament, though in the country local Liberal activists bitterly opposed the government. Finally in late 1933 the Liberals crossed the floor of the House of Commons and went into complete opposition. By this point their number of MPs was severely depleted. In the 1935 general election, just 17 Liberal MPs were elected, along with Lloyd George and three followers as independent Liberals. Immediately after the election the two groups reunited, though Lloyd George declined to play much of a formal role in his old party. Over the next ten years there would be further defections as MPs deserted to either the Liberal Nationals or Labour. Yet there were a few recruits, such as Clement Davies, who had deserted to the National Liberals in 1931 but now returned to the party during World War II and who would lead it after the war.

=== Near extinction ===
Samuel had lost his seat in the 1935 election and the leadership of the party fell to Sir Archibald Sinclair. With many traditional domestic Liberal policies now regarded as irrelevant, he focused the party on opposition to both the rise of fascism in Europe and the appeasement foreign policy of the National Government, arguing that intervention was needed, in contrast to the Labour calls for pacifism. Despite the party's weaknesses, Sinclair gained a high profile as he sought to recall the Midlothian Campaign and once more revitalise the Liberals as the party of a strong foreign policy.

In 1940, they joined Churchill's wartime coalition government, with Sinclair serving as Secretary of State for Air, the last British Liberal to hold Cabinet rank office for seventy years. However, it was a sign of the party's lack of importance that they were not included in the War Cabinet; some leading party members founded Radical Action, a group which called for liberal candidates to break the war-time electoral pact. At the 1945 general election, Sinclair and many of his colleagues lost their seats to both Conservatives and Labour and the party returned just 12 MPs to Westminster, but this was just the beginning of the decline. In 1950, the general election saw the Liberals return just nine MPs. Another general election was called in 1951 and the Liberals were left with just six MPs and all but one of them were aided by the fact that the Conservatives refrained from fielding candidates in those constituencies.

In 1957, this total fell to five when one of the Liberal MPs died and the subsequent by-election was lost to the Labour Party, which selected the former Liberal Deputy Leader Megan Lloyd George as its own candidate. The Liberal Party seemed close to extinction. During this low period, it was often joked that Liberal MPs could hold meetings in the back of one taxi.

=== Liberal revival ===
Through the 1950s and into the 1960s, the Liberals survived only because a handful of constituencies in rural Scotland and Wales clung to their Liberal traditions, whilst in two English towns, Bolton and Huddersfield, local Liberals and Conservatives agreed to each contest only one of the town's two seats. Jo Grimond, for example, who became Leader of the Liberal Party in 1956, was MP for the remote Orkney and Shetland islands. Under his leadership a Liberal revival began, marked by the Orpington by-election of March 1962 which was won by Eric Lubbock. There, the Liberals won a seat in the London suburbs for the first time since 1935.

The Liberals became the first of the major British political parties to advocate British membership of the European Economic Community. Grimond also sought an intellectual revival of the party, seeking to position it as a non-socialist radical alternative to the Conservative government of the day. In particular he canvassed the support of the young post-war university students and recent graduates, appealing to younger voters in a way that many of his recent predecessors had not, and asserting a new strand of Liberalism for the post-war world.

The new middle-class suburban generation began to find the Liberals' policies attractive again. Under Grimond (who retired in 1967) and his successor, Jeremy Thorpe, the Liberals regained the status of a serious third force in British politics, polling up to 20% of the vote, but unable to break the duopoly of Labour and Conservative and win more than fourteen seats in the Commons. An additional problem was competition in the Liberal heartlands in Scotland and Wales from the Scottish National Party and Plaid Cymru who both grew as electoral forces from the 1960s onwards. Although Emlyn Hooson held on to the seat of Montgomeryshire, upon Clement Davies death in 1962, the party lost five Welsh seats between 1950 and 1966. In September 1966, the Welsh Liberal Party formed their own state party, moving the Liberal Party into a fully federal structure.

In local elections, Liverpool remained a Liberal stronghold, with the party taking the plurality of seats on the elections to the new Liverpool Metropolitan Borough Council in 1973. On 26 July 1973, the party won two by-elections on the same day, in the Isle of Ely (with Clement Freud), and Ripon (with David Austick). In the February 1974 general election, the Conservative government of Edward Heath won a plurality of votes cast, but the Labour Party gained a plurality of seats. The Conservatives were unable to form a government due to the Ulster Unionist MPs refusing to support the Conservatives following the Northern Ireland Sunningdale Agreement. The Liberals obtained 6.1 million votes, the most it would ever achieve, and now held the balance of power in the Commons. Conservatives offered Thorpe the Home Office if he would join a coalition government with Heath. Thorpe was personally in favour of it, but the party insisted it would only agree pending a clear government commitment to introducing proportional representation (PR) and a change of prime minister. The former was unacceptable to Heath's cabinet and the latter to Heath personally, so the talks collapsed. Instead, a minority Labour government was formed under Harold Wilson but with no formal support from Thorpe. In the October 1974 general election, the Liberals total vote slipped back slightly (and declined in each of the next three) and the Labour government won a wafer-thin majority.

Thorpe was subsequently forced to resign after allegations that he attempted to have his homosexual lover murdered by a hitman. The party's new leader, David Steel, negotiated the Lib–Lab pact with Wilson's successor as prime minister, James Callaghan. According to this pact, the Liberals would support the government in crucial votes in exchange for some influence over policy. The agreement lasted from 1977 to 1978, but proved mostly fruitless, for two reasons: the Liberals' key demand of PR was rejected by most Labour MPs, whilst the contacts between Liberal spokespersons and Labour ministers often proved detrimental, such as between Treasury spokesperson John Pardoe and Chancellor of the Exchequer Denis Healey, who were mutually antagonistic.

=== Alliance, Liberal Democrats and reconstituted Liberal Party ===
The Conservative Party under the leadership of Margaret Thatcher won the 1979 general election, placing the Labour Party back in opposition, which served to push the Liberals back into the margins.

In 1981, defectors from a moderate faction of the Labour Party, led by former Cabinet ministers Roy Jenkins, David Owen, Shirley Williams and Bill Rodgers founded the Social Democratic Party (SDP). The new party and the Liberals quickly formed the SDP–Liberal Alliance, which for a while polled as high as 50% in the opinion polls and appeared capable of winning the next general election. Indeed, Steel was so confident of an Alliance victory that he told the 1981 Liberal conference, "Go back to your constituencies, and prepare for government!".

However, the Alliance was overtaken in the polls by the Tories in the aftermath of the Falkland Islands War and at the 1983 general election the Conservatives were re-elected by a landslide, with Labour once again forming the opposition. While the SDP–Liberal Alliance came close to Labour in terms of votes (a share of more than 25%), it only had 23 MPs compared to Labour's 209. The Alliance's support was spread out across the country, and was not concentrated in enough areas to translate into seats.

In the 1987 general election, the Alliance's share of the votes fell slightly and it now had 22 MPs. In the election's aftermath Steel proposed a merger of the two parties. Most SDP members voted in favour of the merger, but SDP leader David Owen objected and continued to lead a "rump" SDP.

In March 1988, the Liberal Party and Social Democratic Party merged to create the Social and Liberal Democrats, renamed the Liberal Democrats in October 1989. Over two-thirds of Liberal members joined the merged party, along with all sitting MPs. Steel and SDP leader Robert Maclennan served briefly as interim leaders of the merged party.

A group of Liberal opponents of the merger with the Social Democrats, including Michael Meadowcroft (the former Liberal MP for Leeds West) and Paul Wiggin (who served on Peterborough City Council as a Liberal), continued with a new party organisation under the name of the 'Liberal Party'. Meadowcroft joined the Liberal Democrats in 2007, but the Liberal Party as reconstituted in 1989 continues to hold council seats and field candidates in Westminster Parliamentary elections. Only one of the twelve Liberal candidates in 2024 achieved 5% or more of the votes, resulting in all bar one losing their deposits.

== Ideology ==
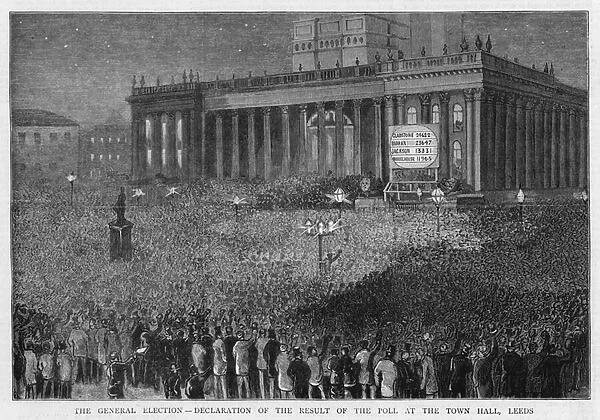
A crowd waits outside Leeds Town Hall to see them elect a Liberal Party candidate during the 1880 general elections.

During the 19th century, the Liberal Party was broadly in favour of what would today be called classical liberalism, supporting laissez-faire economic policies such as free trade and minimal government interference in the economy (this doctrine was usually termed Gladstonian liberalism after the Victorian era Liberal Prime Minister William Gladstone). The Liberal Party favoured social reform, personal liberty, reducing the powers of the Crown and the Church of England (many of them were nonconformists) and an extension of the electoral franchise. Sir William Harcourt, a prominent Liberal politician in the Victorian era, said this about liberalism in 1872:

If there be any party which is more pledged than another to resist a policy of restrictive legislation, having for its object social coercion, that party is the Liberal party. (Cheers.) But liberty does not consist in making others do what you think right, (Hear, hear.) The difference between a free Government and a Government which is not free is principally this—that a Government which is not free interferes with everything it can, and a free Government interferes with nothing except what it must. A despotic Government tries to make everybody do what it wishes; a Liberal Government tries, as far as the safety of society will permit, to allow everybody to do as he wishes. It has been the tradition of the Liberal party consistently to maintain the doctrine of individual liberty. It is because they have done so that England is the place where people can do more what they please than in any other country in the world. [...] It is this practice of allowing one set of people to dictate to another set of people what they shall do, what they shall think, what they shall drink, when they shall go to bed, what they shall buy, and where they shall buy it, what wages they shall get and how they shall spend them, against which the Liberal party have always protested.

The political terms of "modern", "progressive" or "new" Liberalism began to appear in the mid to late 1880s and became increasingly common to denote the tendency in the Liberal Party to favour an increased role for the state as more important than the classical liberal stress on self-help and freedom of choice.

By the early 20th century, the Liberals stance began to shift towards "New Liberalism", what would today be called social liberalism, namely a belief in personal liberty with a support for government intervention to provide social welfare. This shift was best exemplified by the Liberal government of H. H. Asquith and his Chancellor David Lloyd George, whose Liberal reforms in the early 1900s created a basic welfare state.

David Lloyd George adopted a programme at the 1929 general election entitled We Can Conquer Unemployment!, although by this stage the Liberals had declined to third-party status. The Liberals as expressed in the Liberal Yellow Book now regarded opposition to state intervention as being a characteristic of right-wing extremists.

After nearly becoming extinct in the 1940s and the 1950s, the Liberal Party revived its fortunes somewhat under the leadership of Jo Grimond in the 1960s by positioning itself as a radical centrist, non-socialist alternative to the Conservative and Labour Party governments of the time.

=== Religious alignment ===
Since 1660, nonconformist Protestants have played a major role in English politics. Relatively few MPs were Dissenters. However the Dissenters were a major voting bloc in many areas, such as the East Midlands. They were very well organised and highly motivated and largely won over the Whigs and Liberals to their cause. Down to the 1830s, Dissenters demanded removal of political and civil disabilities that applied to them (especially those in the Test and Corporation Acts). The Anglican establishment strongly resisted until 1828. Numerous reforms of voting rights, especially that of 1832, increased the political power of Dissenters. They demanded an end to compulsory church rates, in which local taxes went only to Anglican churches. They finally achieved the end of religious tests for university degrees in 1905. Gladstone brought the majority of Dissenters around to support for Home Rule for Ireland, putting the dissenting Protestants in league with the Irish Roman Catholics in an otherwise unlikely alliance. The Dissenters gave significant support to moralistic issues, such as temperance and sabbath enforcement. The nonconformist conscience, as it was called, was repeatedly called upon by Gladstone for support for his moralistic foreign policy. In election after election, Protestant ministers rallied their congregations to the Liberal ticket. In Scotland, the Presbyterians played a similar role to the Nonconformist Methodists, Baptists and other groups in England and Wales.

By the 1820s, the different Nonconformists, including Wesleyan Methodists, Baptists, Congregationalists and Unitarians, had formed the Committee of Dissenting Deputies and agitated for repeal of the highly restrictive Test and Corporation Acts. These Acts excluded Nonconformists from holding civil or military office or attending Oxford or Cambridge, compelling them to set up their own Dissenting Academies privately. The Tories tended to be in favour of these Acts and so the Nonconformist cause was linked closely to the Whigs, who advocated civil and religious liberty. After the Test and Corporation Acts were repealed in 1828, all the Nonconformists elected to Parliament were Liberals. Nonconformists were angered by the Education Act 1902, which integrated Church of England denominational schools into the state system and provided for their support from taxes. John Clifford formed the National Passive Resistance Committee and by 1906 over 170 Nonconformists had gone to prison for refusing to pay school taxes. They included 60 Primitive Methodists, 48 Baptists, 40 Congregationalists and 15 Wesleyan Methodists.

The political strength of Dissent faded sharply after 1920 with the secularisation of British society in the 20th century. The rise of the Labour Party reduced the Liberal Party strongholds into the nonconformist and remote "Celtic Fringe", where the party survived by an emphasis on localism and historic religious identity, thereby neutralising much of the class pressure on behalf of the Labour movement. Meanwhile, the Anglican Church was a bastion of strength for the Conservative Party. On the Irish issue, the Anglicans strongly supported unionism. Increasingly after 1850, the Roman Catholic element in England and Scotland was composed of recent emigrants from Ireland who largely voted for the Irish Parliamentary Party until its collapse in 1918.

== Liberal leaders ==
=== Liberal Leaders in the House of Lords ===
- Granville Leveson-Gower, 2nd Earl Granville (1859–1865)
- John Russell, 1st Earl Russell (1865–1868)
- Granville Leveson-Gower, 2nd Earl Granville (1868–1891)
- John Wodehouse, 1st Earl of Kimberley (1891–1894)
- Archibald Primrose, 5th Earl of Rosebery (1894–1896)
- John Wodehouse, 1st Earl of Kimberley (1896–1902)
- John Spencer, 5th Earl Spencer (1902–1905)
- George Robinson, 1st Marquess of Ripon (1905–1908)
- Robert Crewe-Milnes, 1st Marquess of Crewe (1908–1923)
- Edward Grey, 1st Viscount Grey of Fallodon (1923–1924)
- William Lygon, 7th Earl Beauchamp (1924–1931)
- Rufus Isaacs, 1st Marquess of Reading (1931–1936)
- Robert Crewe-Milnes, 1st Marquess of Crewe (1936–1944)
- Herbert Samuel, 1st Viscount Samuel (1944–1955)
- Philip Rea, 2nd Baron Rea (1955–1967)
- Frank Byers, Baron Byers (1967–1984)
- Nancy Seear, Baroness Seear (1984–1989)

=== Liberal Leaders in the House of Commons ===
- Henry John Temple, 3rd Viscount Palmerston (1859–1865)
- William Ewart Gladstone (1865–1875)
- Spencer Cavendish, 8th Duke of Devonshire (1875–1880)
- William Gladstone (1880–1894)
- Sir William Harcourt (1894–1898)
- Henry Campbell-Bannerman (1899–1908)
- H. H. Asquith (1908–1916)

=== Leaders of the Liberal Party ===
- H. H. Asquith, 1st Earl of Oxford and Asquith, 1925 (1916–1926)
  - Donald Maclean, Acting Leader (1919–1920)
- David Lloyd George (1926–1931)
- Sir Herbert Samuel (1931–1935)
- Sir Archibald Sinclair (1935–1945)
- Clement Davies (1945–1956)
- Jo Grimond (1956–1967)
- Jeremy Thorpe (1967–1976)
- Jo Grimond, Interim Leader (1976)
- David Steel (1976–1988)

=== Deputy Leaders of the Liberal Party in the House of Commons ===
- Donald Maclean (1920–1922)
- John Simon (1922–1924)
- Post vacant (1924–1929)
- Herbert Samuel (1929–1931)
- Archibald Sinclair (1931–1935)
- Francis Dyke Acland (1935–1939)
- Post vacant (1939–1940)
- Percy Harris (1940–1945)
- Post vacant (1945–1949)
- Megan Lloyd George (1949–1951)
- Post vacant (1951–1962)
- Donald Wade (1962–1964)
- Post vacant (1964–1976)
- John Pardoe (1976–1979)
- Post vacant (1979–1985)
- Alan Beith (1985–1988)

=== Deputy Leaders of the Liberal Party in the House of Lords ===
- Eric Drummond, 7th Earl of Perth (1946–1951)
- Walter Layton, 1st Baron Layton (1952–1955)
- Post vacant (1955–1965)
- Gladwyn Jebb, 1st Baron Gladwyn (1965–1988)

=== Liberal Party front bench team members ===
- 1945–1956
- 1956–1967
- 1967–1976

== Election results ==
Parliament of the United Kingdom
Election	Leader	Votes		Seats		Position	Government
Election	Leader	No.	%	No.	±	Position	Government
1865	Henry John Temple	508,821	59.5	369 / 658	▲13	1st	Liberal
1868 (Note: The first election held under the Reform Act 1867.)	William Ewart Gladstone	1,428,776	61.5	387 / 658	▲18	1st	Liberal
1874	William Ewart Gladstone	1,281,159	52.0	242 / 652	▼145	▼2nd	Conservative
1880	Spencer Cavendish	1,836,423	54.2	352 / 652	▲110	▲1st	Liberal
1885 (Note: The first election held under the Representation of the People Act 1884 and the Redistribution of Seats Act 1885.)	William Ewart Gladstone	2,199,198	47.4	319 / 670	▼33	1st	Liberal minority
1886	William Ewart Gladstone	1,353,581	45.5	192 / 670	▼127	▼2nd	Conservative–Liberal Unionist
1892	William Ewart Gladstone	2,088,019	45.4	272 / 670	▲80	▲1st	Liberal minority
1895	Archibald Primrose	1,765,266	45.7	177 / 670	▼95	▼2nd	Conservative–Liberal Unionist
1900	Henry Campbell-Bannerman	1,572,323	44.7	183 / 670	▲6	2nd	Conservative–Liberal Unionist
1906	Henry Campbell-Bannerman	2,565,644	48.9	397 / 670	▲214	▲1st	Liberal
January 1910	H. H. Asquith	2,712,511	43.5	274 / 670	▼123	1st	Liberal minority
December 1910	H. H. Asquith	2,157,256	43.2	272 / 670	▼2	1st	Liberal minority
1918 (Note: The first election held under the Representation of the People Act 1918 in which all men over 21 and most women over the age of 30 could vote and therefore a much larger electorate.)	H. H. Asquith	1,355,398	13.0	36 / 707	▼236	▼5th	Coalition Liberal–Conservative
1922	H. H. Asquith	2,601,486	18.9	62 / 615	▲26	▲3rd	Conservative
1923	H. H. Asquith	4,129,922	29.7	158 / 615	▲96	3rd	Labour minority
1924	H. H. Asquith	2,818,717	17.8	40 / 615	▼118	3rd	Conservative
1929 (Note: The first election under universal suffrage in which all women aged over 21 could vote.)	David Lloyd George	5,104,638	23.6	59 / 615	▲19	3rd	Labour minority
1931	Herbert Samuel (Note: Liberal Party split into three prior to the 1931 election. Results do not include Liberal Nationals (later known as National Liberals) led by John Simon or the Independent Liberals led by Lloyd George. The Independent Liberals rejoined the Liberals after 1935. The National Liberals became allied with and eventually joined the Conservatives.)	1,346,571	6.5	33 / 615	▼26	▼4th	Conservative–Liberal–National Labour
1935	Herbert Samuel	1,414,010	6.7	21 / 615	▼12	4th	Conservative–Liberal National–National Labour
1945	Archibald Sinclair	2,177,938	9.0	12 / 640	▼9	▲3rd	Labour
1950	Clement Davies	2,621,487	9.1	9 / 625	▼3	▼6th	Labour
1951	Clement Davies	730,546	2.5	6 / 625	▼3	▲4th	Conservative–National Liberal
1955	Clement Davies	722,402	2.7	6 / 630	0	▲3rd	Conservative–National Liberal
1959	Jo Grimond	1,640,760	5.9	6 / 630	0	3rd	Conservative–National Liberal
1964	Jo Grimond	3,099,283	11.2	9 / 630	▲3	3rd	Labour
1966	Jo Grimond	2,327,533	8.5	12 / 630	▲3	3rd	Labour
1970 (Note: Franchise extended to all 18- to 20-year-olds under the Representation of the People Act 1969.)	Jeremy Thorpe	2,117,035	7.5	6 / 630	▼6	3rd	Conservative
February 1974	Jeremy Thorpe	6,059,519	19.3	14 / 635	▲8	3rd	Labour minority
October 1974	Jeremy Thorpe	5,346,704	18.3	13 / 635	▼1	3rd	Labour
1979	David Steel	4,313,804	13.8	11 / 635	▼2	3rd	Conservative
1983	David Steel	4,273,146	25.4 (Alliance) (Note: Popular vote is for SDP-Liberal Alliance, seat total is Liberal component.)	17 / 650	▲6	3rd	Conservative
1987	David Steel	4,170,849	22.6 (Alliance)	17 / 650	0	3rd	Conservative

== See also ==
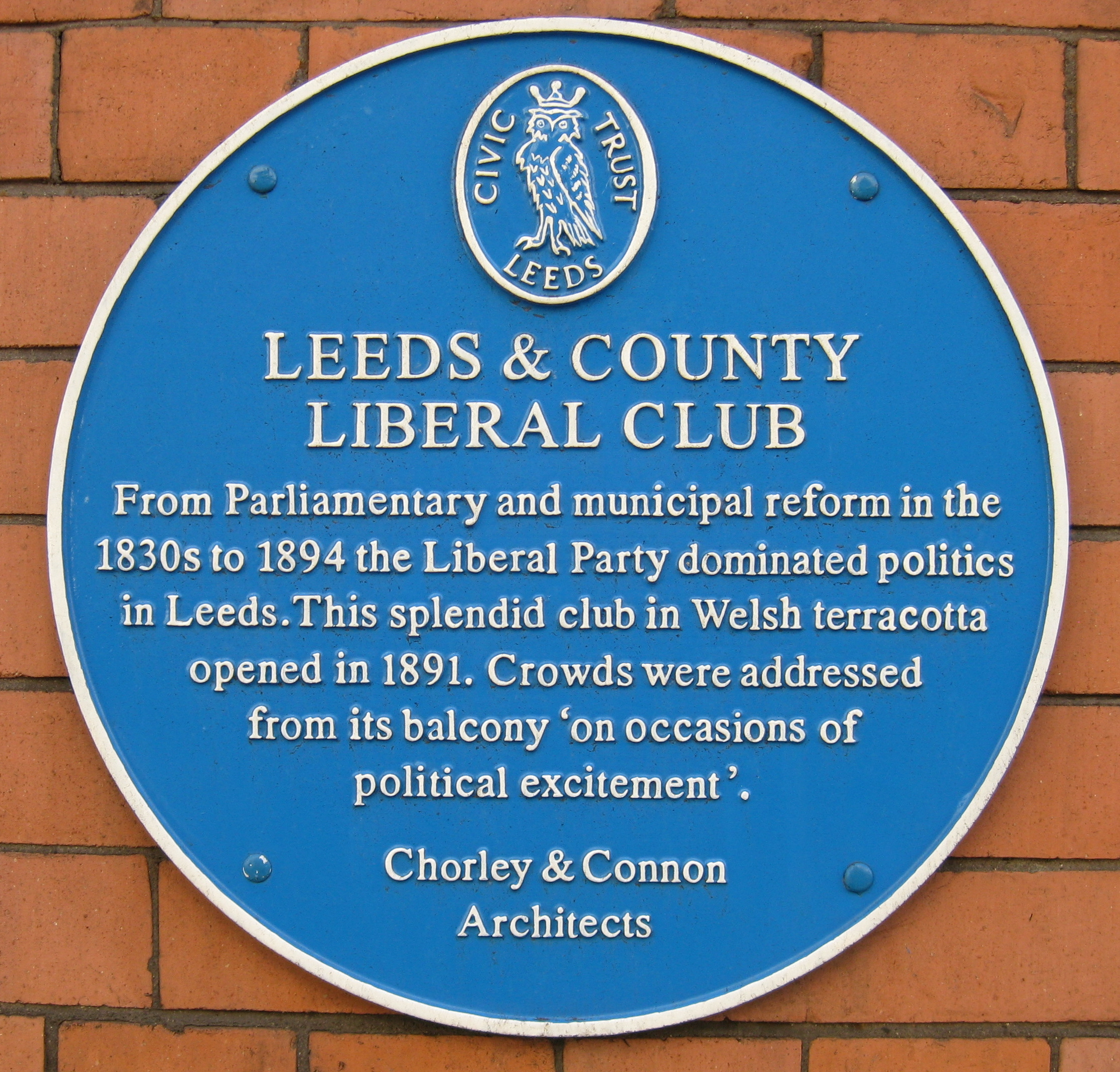
Leeds and County Liberal Club blue plaque

- Category:Liberal Party (UK) MPs
- List of Liberal Party (UK) MPs
- Liberalism in the United Kingdom
- Liberal Democrats
- Leader of the Liberal Party (UK)
- List of United Kingdom Whig and allied party leaders, 1801–1859
- Liberal Chief Whip
- President of the Liberal Party
- List of Liberal Party and Liberal Democrats (UK) general election manifestos
