= Liberal Party (UK, 1989) election results =

Election results of Liberal Party (UK, 1989)

The Liberal Party is a United Kingdom political party that was founded in 1989 by members of the original Liberal Party opposed to its merger with the Social Democratic Party (SDP) to form the Liberal Democrats. The party has never held a UK, Scottish, Senedd or European parliamentary seat, though it has had representation on local councils.

== Parliamentary elections contested ==
=== By-elections 1987–1992 ===
Date	Constituency	Candidate	Votes	%
23 February 1989	Richmond (Yorks)	Nicholas Watkins	70	0.1
24 May 1990	Bootle	Kevin White	474	1.3
27 September 1990	Knowsley, S	Ian Smith	628	3.0
18 October 1990	Eastbourne	Theresia Williamson	526	1.1
8 November 1990	Bootle	Kevin White	291	1.0
9 November 1990	Bradford, N	Noel Nowosielski	187	0.5
7 March 1991	Ribble Valley	Simon Taylor	133	0.3

=== 1992 general election ===
Constituency	Candidate	Votes	%
Aldershot	D Robinson	1,038	1.6
Arundel	D Renson	1,103	1.8
Ashton-under-Lyne	C Hall	907	2.1
Bath	M Barker	172	0.3
Beckenham	G Williams	643	1.4
Bedfordshire, Mid	P Cottier	1,582	2.3
Bootle	M Hall	1,174	2.3
Cambridgeshire, N E	C Ash	998	1.6
Chichester	J Weights	643	1.0
Chingford	D Green	602	1.4
Chislehurst	I Richmond	849	2.0
Corby	J Wood	784	1.4
Cornwall, N	P Andrews	678	1.1
Cornwall, S E	M Cook	644	1.1
Coventry, S W	R Wheway	989	2.0
Crosby	John Marks	1,052	1.6
Denton & Reddish	M Powell	1,296	2.5
Devizes	S Coles	962	1.3
Eastbourne	Theresia Williamson	296	0.5
Edinburgh, Central	R Wilson	235	0.6
Edinburgh, W	A Fleming	272	0.6
Exeter	A Micklem	1,119	1.8
Falmouth & Camborne	Paul Holmes	730	1.3
Fife, N E	D Senior	85	0.2
Grantham	J Hiley	1,500	2.3
Harrow, E	P Burrows	1,142	2.0
Harrow, W	Gabriel Aitman	845	1.6
Heywood & Middleton	Phil Burke	757	1.8
Honiton	Geoffrey Halliwell	1,005	1.6
Horsham	J Elliott	1,281	1.9
Huntingdon	P Wiggin	1,045	1.4
Kingston upon Thames	A Amer	771	2.0
Knowsley, N	K Lappin	1,180	3.3
Leeds, N W	N Nowosielski	427	0.8
Leeds, W	Michael Meadowcroft	3,980	8.3
Leyton	L de Pinna	561	1.5
Lincoln	S Wiggin	603	1.0
Liverpool, Broadgreen	Steve Radford	1,211	2.9
Liverpool, Garston	A Conrad	894	2.2
Liverpool, Walton	T Newall	963	2.0
Liverpool, West Derby	D Curtis	1,021	2.6
Makerfield	S Cairns	1,309	2.4
Manchester, Gorton	T Henderson	767	2.0
Medway	M Austin	1,480	3.0
Northavon	P Marx	380	0.5
Nottingham E	C Roylance	598	1.3
Oxford, W & Abingdon	R Jenkin	194	0.4
Peterborough	E Murat	1,557	2.4
Ravensbourne	Peter White	318	0.7
Rochford	L Farmer	1,362	2.1
St Ives	Graham Stephens	577	1.0
Shoreham	W Weights	459	0.8
Slough	J Clark	1,426	2.5
Somerton & Frome	J Pollock	388	0.7
Southend, E	Brian Lynch	673	1.6
Southend, W	Alan Farmer	495	1.0
Stalybridge & Hyde	R Powell	1,199	2.4
Sunderland, N	W Lundgren	841	1.7
Tiverton	David Morrish	2,225	3.8
Tooting	C Martin	1,340	2.6
Truro	C Tankard	208	0.3
Tweeddale, Ettrick & Lauderdale	John Hein	177	0.6
Twickenham	A Miners	85	0.2
Walthamstow	V Wilkinson	241	0.7
Westbury	P Macdonald	1,440	2.0
Wigan	K White	1,116	2.0
Wiltshire, N	George Hawkins	622	0.9
Wolverhampton, N E	Kenneth Bullman	1,087	2.2
Wolverhampton, S E	Catherine Twelvetrees	850	2.
Wolverhampton, S W	Colin Hallmark	1,237	2.4
Woodspring	Nick Brown	836	1.3
Worthing	N Goble	679	1.1

=== By-elections 1992–1997 ===
Date	Constituency	Candidate	Votes	%
15 December 1994	Dudley, W	Mike Hyde	548	1.3
11 April 1996	South East Staffordshire	Steven Mountford	332	0.8
21 October 1997	Beckenham	Phil Rimmer	330	1.0

=== 1997 general election ===
Source: UK General Election Results 1997 at politicsresources.net

Constituency	Candidate	Votes	%
Beckenham	Phil Rimmer	720	1.3
Bethnal Green & Bow	Terry Milson	2,963	6.6
Birmingham, Perry Barr	Alasdair Baxter	718	1.6
Bromley & Chislehurst	Gabriel Aitman	285	0.5
Camberwell & Peckham	Gerry Williams	443	1.6
Cornwall, N	Rif Winfield	186	0.3
Cornwall, S E	Bill Weights	268	0.5
Coventry, N E	Nick Brown	1,181	2.5
Coventry, N W	Rob Wheway	687	1.3
Coventry S	Roger Jenking	725	1.5
Crosby	John Marks	233	0.5
Devon, E	Geoffrey Halliwell	1,363	2.6
Devon, W & Torridge	Michael Pithouse	50	0.9
Dulwich & W Norwood	Alex Goldie	587	1.3
Eastbourne	Theresia Williamson	741	1.4
Edinburgh, W	Paul Coombes	263	0.6
Eltham	Henry Middleton	584	1.3
Exeter	David Morrish	2,062	3.3
Falmouth & Camborne	Paul Holmes	527	1.0
Halton	David Proffitt	600	1.4
Hastings & Rye	Jane Amstad	1,046	2.1
Heywood & Middleton	Phil Burke	750	1.5
Leeds, W	Noel Nowosielski	625	1.6
Lewisham, E	Peter White	277	0.7
Lewisham, W	Liz Oram	167	0.4
Liverpool, Garston	Gary Copeland	666	1.5
Liverpool, Riverside	David Green	594	1.6
Liverpool, Walton	Hazel Williams	352	0.9
Liverpool Wavertree	Keith McCullough	391	0.9
Liverpool, West Derby	Steve Radford	4,037	9.6
Maidenhead	David Munkley	896	1.8
Newcastle-under-Lyme	Steven Mountford	1,399	2.9
Orpington	Robin Almond	494	0.8
Portsmouth, S	John Thompson	184	0.4
Rayleigh	Alan Farmer	829	1.6
Rochford & Southend, E	Brian Lynch	1,007	2.2
Romford	Terry Hurlstone	1,100	2.6
Slough	Anne Bradshaw	1,835	3.8
South Ribble	Nigel Ashton	1,127	2.0
Southport	Susan Ashton	386	0.8
Southwark, N & Bermondsey	Jim Munday	157	0.4
St. Ives	Graham Stephens	425	0.8
Stoke-on-Trent, Central	Fran Oborski	359	0.9
Stoke-on-Trent, S	Alison Micklem	580	1.3
Stone	Ann Winfield	545	1.0
Tamworth	Catherine Twelvetrees	177	0.4
Tiverton	Jenny Roach	635	1.1
Torbay	Bruce Cowling	1161	2.2
Tweeddale, Ettrick & Lauderdale	John Hein	387	1.0
Westbury	George Hawkins	1,956	3.5
Windsor	Paul Bradshaw	388	0.8
Wolverhampton, N E	Colin Hallmark	1,560	3.8
Wolverhampton, S E	Kenneth Bullman	647	1.9
Wolverhampton, S W	Mike Hyde	713	1.5
Wyre Forest	Chris Harvey	1,670	3.0

=== By-elections 1997–2001 ===
Date	Constituency	Candidate	Votes	%
21 October 1997	Beckenham	Phil H. Rimmer	330	1.0

=== 2001 general election ===
Constituency	Candidate	Votes	%
Beckenham	Riff Winfield	234	0.5
Eastbourne	Theresia Williamson	574	1.3
Exeter	David Morrish	2,596	4.9
Falmouth & Camborne	Paul Holmes	649	1.4
Heywood & Middleton	Philip Burke	1,021	2.6
Hove	Nigel Donovan	316	0.8
Leeds, W	Noel Nowosielski	462	1.4
Liverpool, West Derby	Steve Radford	4,601	14.9
Rochford & Southend E.	Brian Lynch	600	1.6
Somerton & Frome	Jean Pollock	354	0.7
Southport	David Green	767	1.9
Tiverton & Honiton	Jennifer Roach	594	1.1
Tweeddale, Ettrick & Lauderdale	John Hein	383	1.2

=== 2005 general election ===
Constituency	Candidate	Votes	%
Berwickshire, Roxburgh & Selkirk	John Hein	916	2.0
Exeter	Margaret Danks	2,214	4.0
Falmouth & Camborne	Paul Holmes	423	0.9
Fylde	Tim Akeroyd	1,647	3.6
Hackney S & Shoreditch	Benjamin Rae	313	1.0
Heywood & Middleton	Phil Burke	1,377	3.5
Kingston upon Hull East	Janet Toker	1,018	3.3
Liverpool, Walton	Daniel Wood	480	1.7
Liverpool, West Derby	Steve Radford	3,606	11.8
Ryedale	John Clarke	1,417	3.2
Teignbridge	Reginald Wills	685	1.1
Tiverton & Honiton	Roy Collins	1,701	2.9
Vale Of Glamorgan	Karl-James Langford	605	1.3
Wyre Forest	Fran Oborski	2,666	5.7

=== 2010 general election ===
Constituency	Candidate	Votes	%
Edinburgh North & Leith	John Hein	389	0.8
Exeter	Chris Gale	1,108	2.1
Hackney South & Shoreditch	Ben Rae	539	1.3
Liverpool West Derby	Steve Radford	3,327	9.3
Thirsk & Malton	John Clark	1,418	3.7

=== 2015 general election ===
Constituency	Candidate	Votes	%
Chelmsford	Henry Arthur Boyle	665	1.2
Liverpool West Derby	Steve Radford	2,049	5.0
Peterborough	Chris Ash	639	1.4
Thirsk & Malton	John Clark	1,127	2.2

=== 2017 general election ===
Constituency	Candidate	Votes	%
Altrincham and Sale West	Neil Taylor	299	0.6
Devon Central	Lloyd Knight	470	0.8
Liverpool West Derby	Steve Radford	2,150	4.8
Thirsk & Malton	John Clark	753	1.3

=== 2019 general election ===
Constituency	Candidate	Votes	%
Altrincham & Sale West	Neil Taylor	458	0.8
Blaydon	Kathy King	653	1.6
Bridgwater and West Somerset	F Moussa	755	1.3
Calder Valley	Richard Phillips	721	1.2
Camborne and Redruth	Paul Thomas Holmes	676	1.3
City of London & Westminster	Dirk van Heck	101	0.2
Garston and Halewood	Hazel Williams	344	0.6
Knowsley	Raymond Frank Catesby	405	0.7
Lincoln	Charles William Shaw	304	0.6
Liverpool Walton	Billy Lake	660	1.6
Liverpool Wavertree	Mick Coyne	501	1.2
Liverpool West Derby	Steve Radford	1,826	4.2
North Cornwall	Elmars Vilnis Liepens	572	1.1
Sefton Central	Angela Preston	285	0.6
South East Cornwall	Jay Latham	869	1.6
St Austell and Newquay	Richard Byrne	626	1.1
St Ives	Robert Lee Smith	314	0.6
Stalybridge and Hyde	John Anthony Edge	435	1.0
Truro and Falmouth	Paul William Nicholson	413	0.7

=== 2021 Scottish Parliament election ===
Constituency	Candidate	Votes	%
Glasgow Southside	Derek Jackson	102	0.3%

=== 2024 general election ===
Constituency	Candidate	Votes	%
Camborne and Redruth	Paul Holmes	624	1.3
East Renfrewshire	Allan Steele	481	1.0
Lincoln	Charles Shaw	278	0.7
Liverpool Garston	Alan Tormey	401	1.0
Liverpool Riverside	Sean Weaver	256	0.8
Liverpool Walton	Billy Lake	452	1.2
Liverpool West Derby	Steve Radford	2,336	6.1
Runcorn and Helsby	Danny Clarke	479	1.1
St Austell and Newquay	Jay Latham	490	1.0
St Ives	Paul Nicholson	187	0.4
South Cotswolds	Chris Twells	225	0.4
Truro and Falmouth	Peter White	166	0.3

=== By-elections 2024–present ===
Date	Constituency	Candidate	Votes	%
1 May 2025	Runcorn and Helsby	Dan Clarke	454	1.4
