= Lord Randolph Churchill (book) =

Book by Winston Churchill

Lord Randolph Churchill is a two-part biography written by Winston Churchill of his father, the Victorian politician Lord Randolph Churchill. It was first published in 1906.

== Background ==
From 1903 until 1905, Churchill was engaged in writing Lord Randolph Churchill, a two-volume biography of his father which was published in 1906 and received much critical acclaim. The book was Churchill’s main preoccupation in those years apart from his own career. Theodore Roosevelt, who had known Lord Randolph, reviewed the book as "a clever, tactful and rather cheap and vulgar life of that clever, tactful and rather cheap and vulgar egotist". Churchill by this time was beginning to display great mastery of English style and the book is not marred by the "almost comic” excess of adjectives and similes in his first book The Story of the Malakand Field Force.

Like Robert Peel and William Ewart Gladstone before him, Churchill began his career as his father's son. In the early 1900s his ginger group the Hughligans resembled Lord Randolph's Fourth Party in the early 1880s. Churchill fought against the party hierarchy like his father and observers like Wilfred Scawen Blunt noticed his aping of his father in dress and mannerisms. However, filial devotion caused him to soften some of his father's less attractive aspects in the biography.

Rhodes James comments that the book analyses the politics of 1880s better than it analyses Lord Randolph's character. Churchill stressed his father's showmanship and gift for making unexpected moves, while the final passage states that Lord Randolph had almost succeeded in appealing to the wider public beyond party politics. Rhodes James comments that many in 1905 would not have recognised this portrait of Lord Randolph, and that it says more about Winston.

Some historians suggest Churchill used the book in part to vindicate his own career and in particular to justify his crossing the floor from the Conservatives to the Liberal Party in 1904. Churchill later claimed that his study of his father's supposed betrayal by the Conservative leadership after 1886 was the main reason he left the Conservative Party. This is probably untrue – Churchill already held this opinion before writing his father's biography.
