= RFHS =

RFHS can refer to:

- Rock Falls High School, Rock Falls, Illinois
- River Falls High School, River Falls, Wisconsin
- Roaring Fork High School, Carbondale, Colorado
- Rock Ferry High School, Rock Ferry, Wirral, England
- Rosa Fort High School, Tunica, Mississippi
