= Birkenhead Park School =

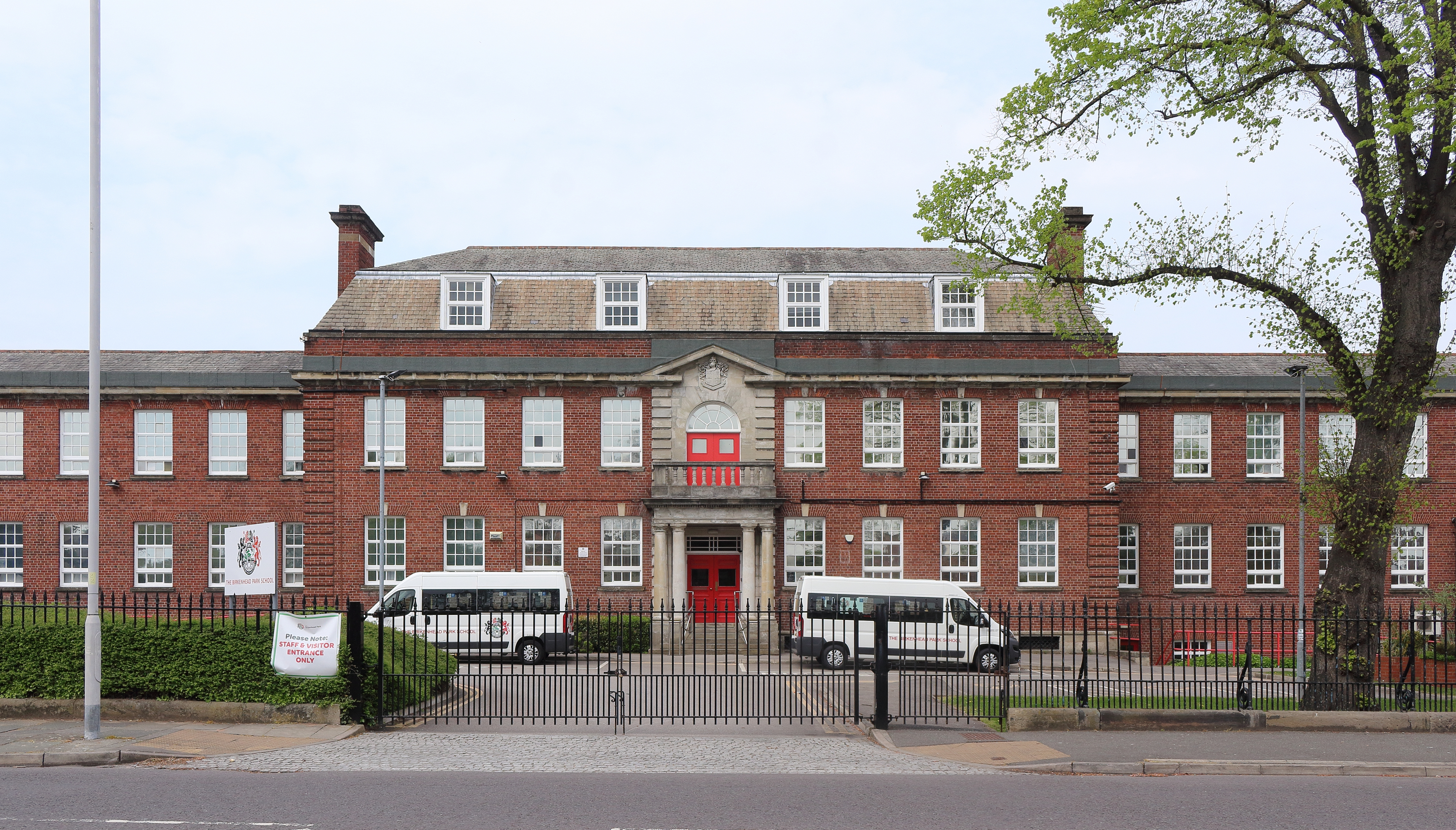

Location
- Park Road South; Birkenhead, Merseyside, CH43 4UY; England
- 53°23′26″N 3°02′34″W

Information
- Type: Academy
- Motto: Hold Fast That Which Is Good
- Established: 2011 (Rock Ferry High School 1925, Park High Grammar School 1926)
- Trust: The BePART Educational Trust
- Specialist: Sports College
- Department for Education URN: 136411 Tables
- Ofsted: Reports
- Head teacher: Danielle Dawes (Head of School) Mike Kilbride (Executive Headteacher)
- Gender: Co-educational
- Age: 11 to 16
- Enrolment: 526
- Website: birkenheadparkschool.com

Birkenhead Park School is a co-educational 11–16 secondary school with academy status near Birkenhead Park, in Birkenhead on the Wirral Peninsula in England. It was renamed University Academy Birkenhead in 2011 from the merger of Park High School and Rock Ferry High School and was based at the former Park High School site. It was a Grammar School (Park High Grammar School for Girls ) from 1926 to 1971, then went Co Educational in 1971 and was then just called Park High School.

University Academy Birkenhead was sponsored by the University of Chester, the University of Liverpool, Birkenhead Sixth Form College, Wirral Metropolitan College and Wirral Metropolitan Borough Council. In April 2015 the school transferred to the control of the BePART Educational Trust, with Birkenhead Sixth Form College as sole sponsor, and took its current name.

== Former pupils ==
=== Park High Grammar School ===
- Hilda Ellis Davidson, academic and antiquarian
- Sir Leslie Froggatt, chairman of Shell Australia
- Stephen F. Kelly, author and broadcaster
- Peter Johnson, businessman
- Tom Palin, artist
- George Withy, journalist
- Steve Wilcockson, archdeacon of Doncaster

==== Park High School ====
- Emma Wray, television actress
- Emma Rodgers artist, sculptor
