= Leslie Froggatt =

Australian businessman (1920–2010)

Sir Leslie Trevor Froggatt (8 April 1920 – 21 October 2010) was a British-born Australian businessman, who was chairman and CEO of Shell Australia from 1969 to 1980.

== Early life ==
Froggatt was born in 1920 at Birkenhead in Cheshire, the son of May and Leslie Trevor Froggatt, a merchant navy engineer. He was educated at Birkenhead Park High Grammar School, where he captained the cricket and rugby teams and was school vice-captain.

In 1937, Froggatt was employed by the Asiatic Petroleum Company (later Royal Dutch Shell) as an accountant, attending night classes to improve his accounting skills.

== Military career ==
Upon the outbreak of World War II in 1939, Froggatt intended to join the Royal Navy, but instead joined the Merchant Navy where he trained as a radio operator. He served aboard the freighter Centaur when it picked up German survivors of the battle between HMAS Sydney and German auxiliary cruiser Kormoran in November 1941. Eighteen months later, Froggatt fell ill and was hospitalised in Melbourne. As such, he was not on board Centaur when it was torpedoed and sunk by a Japanese submarine.

== Shell ==
Froggatt remained in Melbourne following the end of the war, and rejoined Shell Australia as an accountant. In 1947 he was posted to Singapore where he worked until 1954, with interim postings in Bangkok and Penang. He was posted to Egypt from 1955 to 1956, and was detained under house arrest for six months during the Suez Crisis. As Shell's deputy general manager for Indonesia, he worked in Jakarta and Borneo, followed by senior roles in the company in the United States and Europe.

In 1969, Froggatt was appointed chairman and CEO of Shell Australia. During his time as CEO, he was responsible for Shell's involvement in the North West Shelf Venture. He retired as CEO in 1980, but remained with the company as a non-executive director.

== Honours ==
Froggatt was made a Knight Bachelor in the Queen's Birthday Honours of 1981, in recognition of service to commerce and industry.
