= Rock Ferry High School =

Coordinates: 53.36499°N 3.01029°W

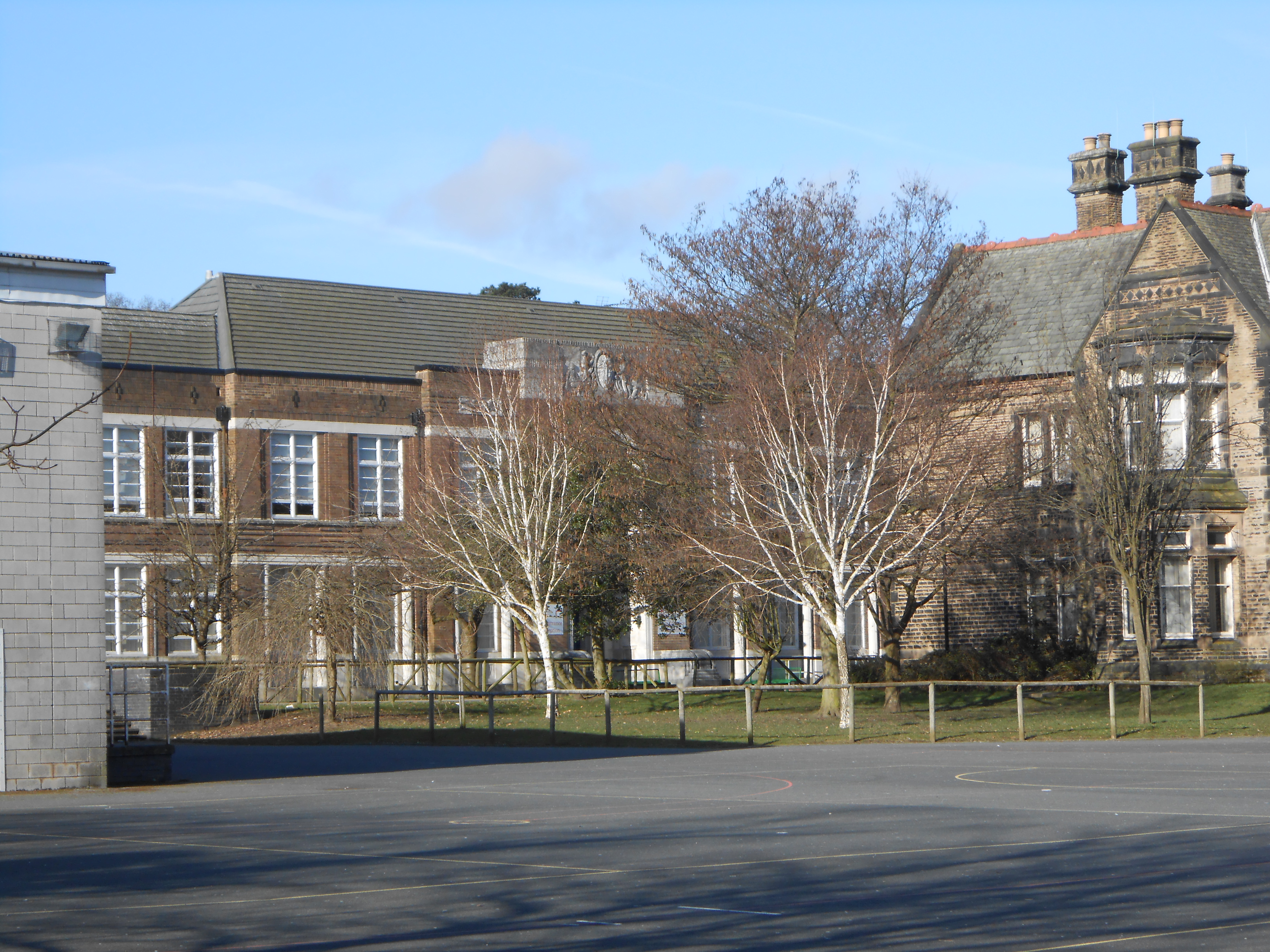
- The school building in March 2013.

Location
- Ravenswood Avenue; Birkenhead; CH42 4NY; England

Information
- School district: Wirral
- Local authority: Wirral
- Department for Education URN: 105094 Tables

Rock Ferry High School was a secondary school located in Rock Ferry, Wirral, England.

== History ==
Rock Ferry opened in the 1920s and was a boy's grammar school originally until it became a boys comprehensive school, girls started to join in 1985, initially in the sixth form due to the relative strength of the teaching at sixth form level and later girls entered at lower school level.

Some students from that school died in World War II and there was a plaque of their names in the foyer of the school.

The school was formally merged with Park High School in January 2011 to create University Academy Birkenhead (now Birkenhead Park School). On 13 April 2011, over 100 pupils aging 12–16 from RFHS began to protest over teachers redundancies and the merger with Park High School in central Birkenhead, it ended with police having to step in but there were no serious incidents apart from a few arguments.

In 2014, a planning application was made to demolish the school buildings except for one listed building. Campaigners set up a group to demand the protection of the site, in particular the Art Deco-influenced main school building. In September 2015 the council agreed to modify its plans for the site, with the Grade II listed Ravenswood building being retained and refurbished by the council and the school playing fields being retained for community use. The rest of the school site is expected to be redeveloped for housing.

The school was demolished in November 2016.

== Notable former pupils ==
- Peter Avery, Persian scholar
- John Charmley, professor of modern history at the University of East Anglia
- Alan Goodall, footballer
- Jason McAteer, footballer
- Alex Hay, footballer (Tranmere Rovers & Rushden and Diamonds)
- Norman Thelwell, cartoonist
- Gareth Thomas, Labour MP for Clwyd West 1997 – 2005
