= People's Budget =

1910 British legislation

1909 and 1910 United Kingdom budget
Finance (1909–10) Act 1910
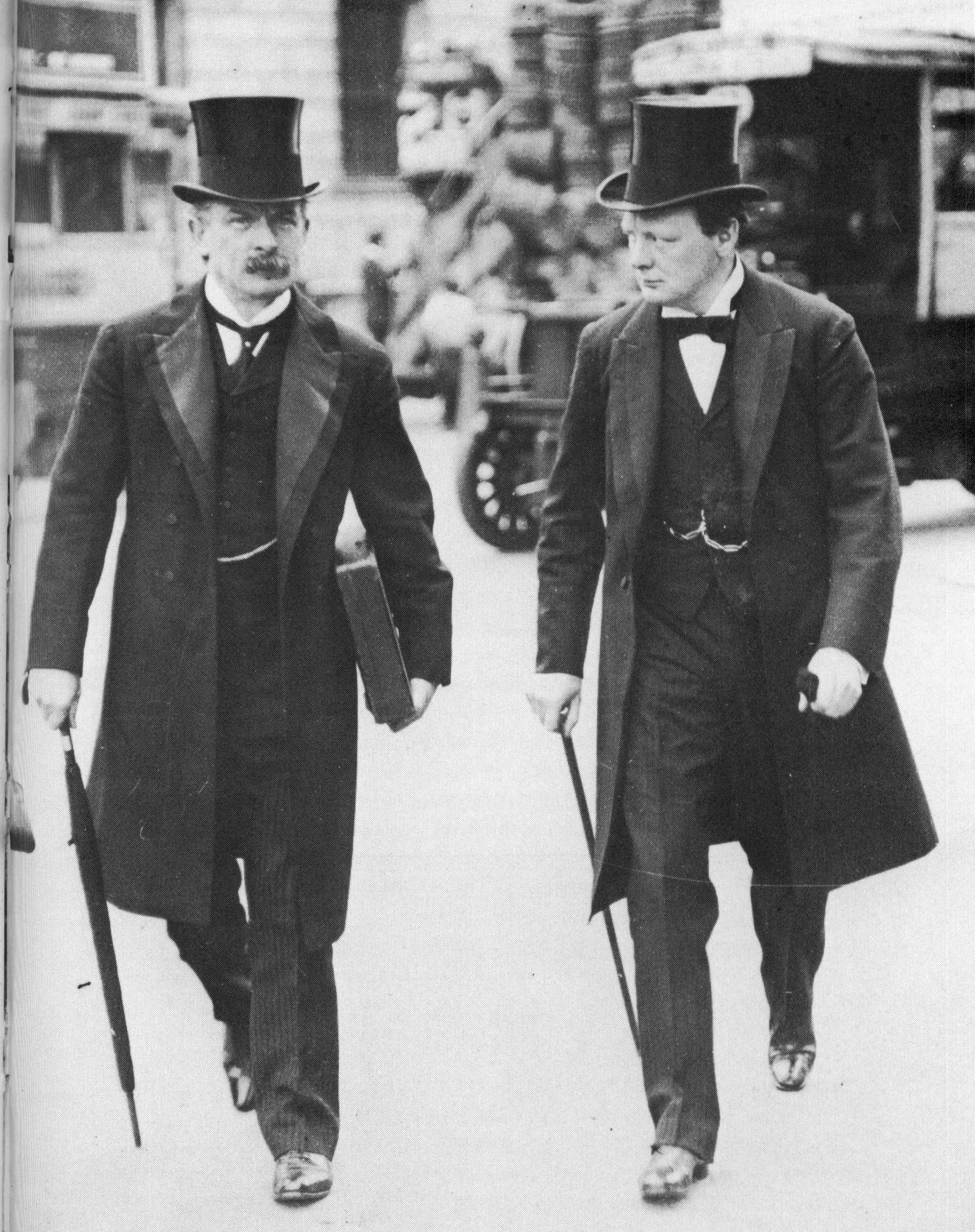
- David Lloyd George (left) and Winston Churchill (right)
- Presented: 29 April 1909
- Passed: 29 April 1910
- Country: United Kingdom
- Parliament: 28th and 29th
- Party: Liberal Party
- Chancellor: David Lloyd George
- Website: Hansard

Finance (1909–10) Act 1910 (Note: Section 96(7).)
- Act of Parliament
- Parliament of the United Kingdom
- Long title: An Act to grant certain Duties of Customs and Inland Revenue (including Excise), to alter other Duties, and to amend the Law relating to Customs and Inland Revenue (including Excise), and to make other financial provisions.
- Citation: 10 Edw. 7. & 1 Geo. 5. c. 8
- Territorial extent: United Kingdom

Dates
- Royal assent: 29 April 1910
- Commencement: 29 April 1910 (Note: The Acts of Parliament (Commencement) Act 1793.)
Other legislation
Amends	Excise Act 1834; Finance Act 1897; Finance Act 1904
Repeals/revokes	Tobacco Planting and Sowing Act 1660; Navigation Act 1663
Amended by	Statute Law Revision Act 1953; Statute Law Revision Act 1963; Finance Act 1969; Statute Law (Repeals) Act 1971; Statute Law (Repeals) Act 1993

Status: Partially repealed

Text of statute as originally enacted

Text of the Finance (1909–10) Act 1910 as in force today (including any amendments) within the United Kingdom, from legislation.gov.uk.

The People's Budget was a proposal of the Liberal government that introduced unprecedented taxes on the lands and incomes of Britain's wealthy to fund new social welfare programmes in 1910, such as non-contributary old age pensions under Old Age Pensions Act 1908. It passed the House of Commons in 1909 but was blocked by the House of Lords for a year and became law in April 1910.

It was championed by the Chancellor of the Exchequer, David Lloyd George, and his young ally Winston Churchill, who was then President of the Board of Trade and a fellow Liberal.

William Manchester, one of Churchill's biographers, called the People's Budget a "revolutionary concept" because it was the first budget in British history with the expressed intent of redistributing wealth equally amongst the British population. It was a key issue of contention between the Liberal government and the Conservative-dominated House of Lords. When the House of Lords rejected the budget in November 1909, the government called a general election in January 1910. Liberals lost some seats in the election, but they still had enough support to remain in government. After the election, the House of Lords eventually passed the People's Budget in April 1910.

== Description ==
The Budget was introduced in the British Parliament by David Lloyd George on 29 April 1909. Lloyd George argued that the People's Budget would eliminate poverty, and commended it thus:

This is a war Budget. It is for raising money to wage implacable warfare against poverty and squalidness. I cannot help hoping and believing that before this generation has passed away, we shall have advanced a great step towards that good time, when poverty, and the wretchedness and human degradation which always follows in its camp, will be as remote to the people of this country as the wolves which once infested its forests.

The budget included several proposed tax increases to fund the Liberal welfare reforms. Income tax was held at nine pence in the pound 3.75% for incomes under £2,000, while a higher rate of 5% was suggested for incomes over £2,000.

More controversially, the Budget also included a proposal for the introduction of complete land valuation and a 20% tax on increases in value when land changed hands. Land taxes were based on the ideas of the American tax reformer Henry George. This would have had a major effect on large landowners, and the Conservative-Unionist opposition, many of whom were large landowners, had had an overwhelming majority in the Lords since the Liberal split in 1886. Furthermore, the Conservatives believed that money should be raised through the introduction of tariffs on imports, which would benefit British industry and trade within the Empire, and raise revenue for social reforms at the same time; but this was also unpopular as it would have meant higher prices on imported food. According to economic theory, such tariffs would have been very beneficial for landowners, especially tariffs on agricultural produce, but the costs to ordinary consumers would have exceeded the gains to these landowners (see Corn Laws).

== Support ==
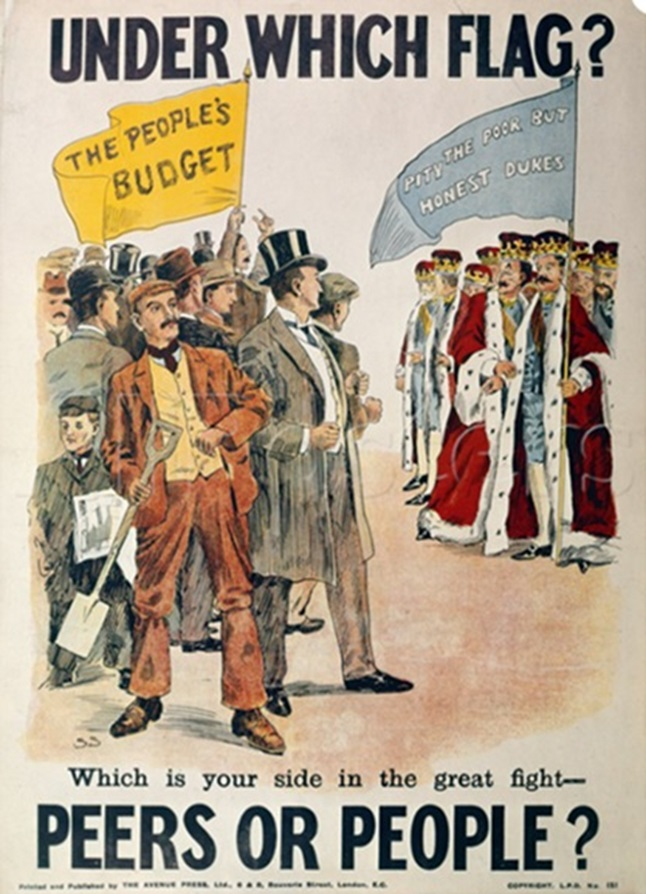
Election poster from "Labour Party and Democratic League" (a faction of the Labour Party)

The People's Budget was supported by David Lloyd George and Winston Churchill. They believed that increasing taxes on rich people and landowners could help pay for social welfare programs and reduce poverty. Many members of the Liberal Party also supported the budget because they thought it was a good step towards social change. The Labour Party liked the budget too, as it put more taxes on wealthier individuals. Supporters even created a group called Budget League, led by Churchill, to encourage public support for the budget.

Lloyd George gave several important speeches to support the People's Budget, explaining why the government needed to address poverty and economic inequality. The main purpose of these speeches was to help communicate the ideas of about the People's Budget and persuade people to support it. In his Newcastle speech, Lloyd George criticized the House of Lords for keeping the rich in a good position while ignoring the struggles of ordinary people. He believed workers deserved better care and the government should focus on reducing poverty and inequality. In his speech, he supported the People's Budget and showed the need for social changes to improve life for everyone.

The Conservatives opposed the people's budget because they did not want the taxes to negatively affect landowners and businesses. The Conservatives wanted to tax imported goods to keep British industries strong instead of increasing taxes on the rich. Lloyd George disagreed with rich people wanting the government to support them, but did not wanting to pay more taxes. Conservative leaders like Arthur Balfour opposed Liberal plans to increase taxes on the rich and land.

As the Conservatives had control of the House of Lords, they were able to reject the People's Budget. They voted 350 to 75 on November 30, 1909 that they would reject the budget. This led to tension between the House of Commons and the House of Lords as the House of Commons usually had control over finances. An argument developed over whether the House of Lords or the people who were voted for should have this power.

== Constitutional stand-off ==
The Northcliffe Press (who published both The Times and the Daily Mail) urged rejection of the budget to give tariff reform a chance. There were many public meetings, some of them organised by dukes, which portrayed the budget as the thin end of the socialist wedge. Lloyd George gave a speech at Newcastle upon Tyne in October 1909 in which he said that "a fully-equipped duke costs as much to keep up as two Dreadnoughts; and dukes are just as great a terror and they last longer". The Conservatives wanted to force an election by rejecting the budget.

The Lords were entitled by convention to reject but not to amend a money bill, but had not rejected a budget for two centuries. Originally, the budget had included only annual renewals of existing taxes—any amendment to taxes was part of a separate Act. That ended in 1860 when the Lords rejected the repeal of paper duties, which would have benefited new cheaper newspapers aimed at men who hoped soon to be given the right to vote, at the expense of existing papers. From then on, all taxes were included in the Finance Bill, and no such bill had been rejected, including the controversial introduction of death duties by Sir William Harcourt in 1894.

Despite Edward VII's private urgings for the budget to be passed to avoid a crisis, the House of Lords vetoed the new budget on 30 November 1909 although it clarified that it would pass the bill as soon as the Liberals obtained an electoral mandate for it. The Liberals countered by proposing to reduce the power of the Lords. That was the main issue of the general election in January 1910, setting the stage for a tremendous showdown, which Lloyd George relished.

Despite the heated rhetoric, opinion in the country was divided. The Unionists, with 47% of the votes, were outpolled by the Liberals and their allies from the Labour Party. The outcome was a hung parliament, with the Liberals relying on Labour and the Irish Parliamentary Party for their parliamentary majority. As the price for their continued support, the Irish nationalist MPs demanded measures to remove the Lords' veto so that they could no longer block Irish Home Rule. They even threatened to vote down the Budget in the House of Commons (Irish Nationalists favoured tariff reform and abhorred the planned increase in whisky duty) until Asquith pledged to introduce such measures.

As they had promised, the Lords accepted the budget on 28 April 1910, but contention between the government and the Lords continued until the second general election in December 1910, when the Unionists were again outpolled by their combined opponents. The result was another hung parliament, with the Liberals again relying on Labour and the Irish Parliamentary Party. Nonetheless, the Lords passed the Parliament Act 1911 when faced with the threat, obtained from a narrowly convinced new king George V (Edward VII having died on 6 May 1910, seven days after the budget was passed), that it would be acceptable to flood the House of Lords with hundreds of new Liberal Party peers to give that party a majority or a near-majority there.

== See also ==
- Budget League
- Budget Protest League
- The Land (song)
- Welfare state in the United Kingdom

== Sources ==
- Blewett, Neal. The peers, the parties and the people : the British general elections of 1910 (1972) online
- Bradley, A.W.; Ewing, K.D. (2007). Constitutional and Administrative Law (14th ed.). Harlow, UK: Longman. ISBN 978-1-4058-1207-8.
- Cross, Colin (1963). The Liberals in Power (1905–1914). London: Barrie and Rockliff with Pall Mall Press.
- Daunton, Martin. Trusting Leviathan: The Politics of Taxation in Britain 1799–1914 (Cambridge University Press, 2001), chapter 11.online
- Gilbert, Bentley Brinkerhoff. "David Lloyd George: Land, The Budget, and Social Reform". American Historical Review 81.5 (1976): 1058–1066. online
- Gilbert, Bentley Brinkerhoff. David Lloyd George A Political Life: The Architect of Change 1863–1912 (Ohio State University Press, 1987), pp 361–398
- Grigg, John. Lloyd George, the people's champion, 1902-1911 (1978). pp. 170–291. online
- Jenkins, Roy. Mr. Balfour's poodle: an account of the struggle between the House of Lords and the government of Mr. Asquith. (1968) online
- Lee, Geoffrey. The People's Budget: An Edwardian Tragedy (Shepheard-Walwyn, 2008).
- Magnus, Philip (1964). King Edward The Seventh. London: John Murray. ISBN 0140026584.
- Morgan, Kenneth O. "‘Rare and refreshing fruit’: Lloyd George's People's Budget." Public Policy Research 16.1 (2009). https://doi.org/10.1111/j.1744-540X.2009.00551.x
- Murray, Bruce K. The People's Budget, 1909-10: Lloyd George and Liberal Politics (Oxford University Press. 1980).
  - Murray, Bruce K. "The Politics of the 'People's Budget'." Historical journal 16#3 (1973): 555–570. JSTOR 2638204. also online
  - Murray, Bruce (Autumn 2009). "The "People's Budget" A Century On" (PDF). Journal of Liberal History (64). Liberal Democrat History Group: 4–13.
  - Murray, Bruce K. "The Unionist Leaders and the rejection of the 'People's Budget', 1909." South African Historical Journal 8.1 (1976): 84–103.
- Watson, Steven. "The Budget and the Lords: the Crisis of 1909–11." History Today (1953) 3#4 pp. 240–248. online
