= Budget Protest League =

British pressure group formed in 1909

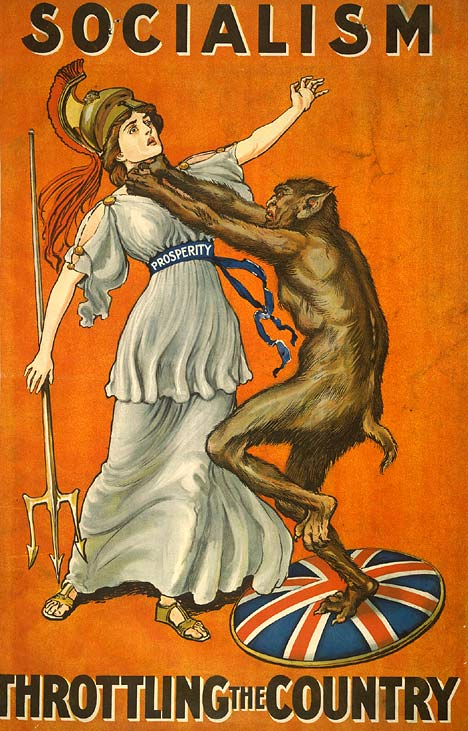
One of the posters produced by the League.

The Budget Protest League was a British pressure group formed in June 1909 and led by Walter Long to oppose David Lloyd George's "People's Budget" outside of Parliament.

The League attacked the Budget's Finance (1909-10) Act 1910 as Socialist because of its income tax rises, increased death duties, and a land value tax in order to redistribute this to old age pensions. It was not linked to tariff reform. It produced posters outlining its opposition to Lloyd George and the Budget.

In a letter to The Times announcing the formation of the Budget Protest League, Long said:

It is unconstitutional to endeavour to secure, under cover of a Finance Bill, the acceptance by Parliament of legislative proposals very similar to, if not identical with, those which were rejected by the House of Lords last year...it is generally recognized by Socialists themselves that it embodies principles which are frankly Socialistic. Moreover, the increased expenditure upon naval construction is wholly inadequate to meet the requirements of the situation. Never during my Parliamentary career have I known such strong and general feelings of hostility to any financial proposals, and a desire is expressed on all sides, and by men of all classes, that the Budget should be rejected...it is impossible to exaggerate the gravity of the consequences which must follow in our country districts if the new taxation is allowed to pass. There are many owners of land who are only able with the utmost difficulty to maintain existing payments in connexion with their property. If these are called upon to pay heavy additional taxation it is inevitable that in many cases they will be compelled to resort to a reduction of the labour bill on their estates—a form of economy which in almost all cases they have in the past made sacrifices to avoid.

In reaction to the formation of this League there was formed a Budget League—chaired by Winston Churchill—to promote the "People's Budget".
