= Budget League =

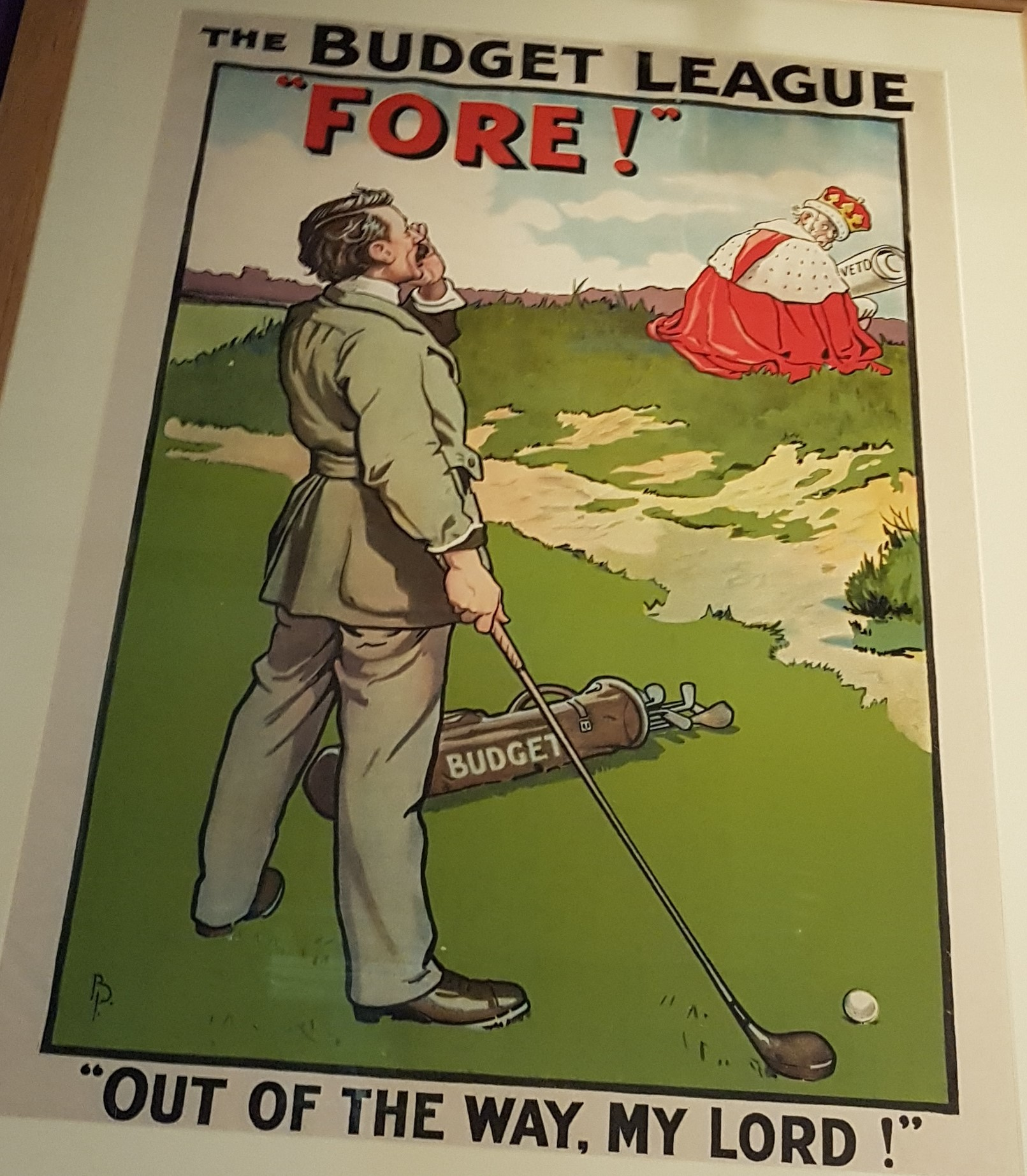
Out of the way, my lord!

The Budget League was a British pressure group formed in 1909 by Winston Churchill to publicly campaign in favour of David Lloyd George's People's Budget in reaction to the activities of the Budget Protest League.

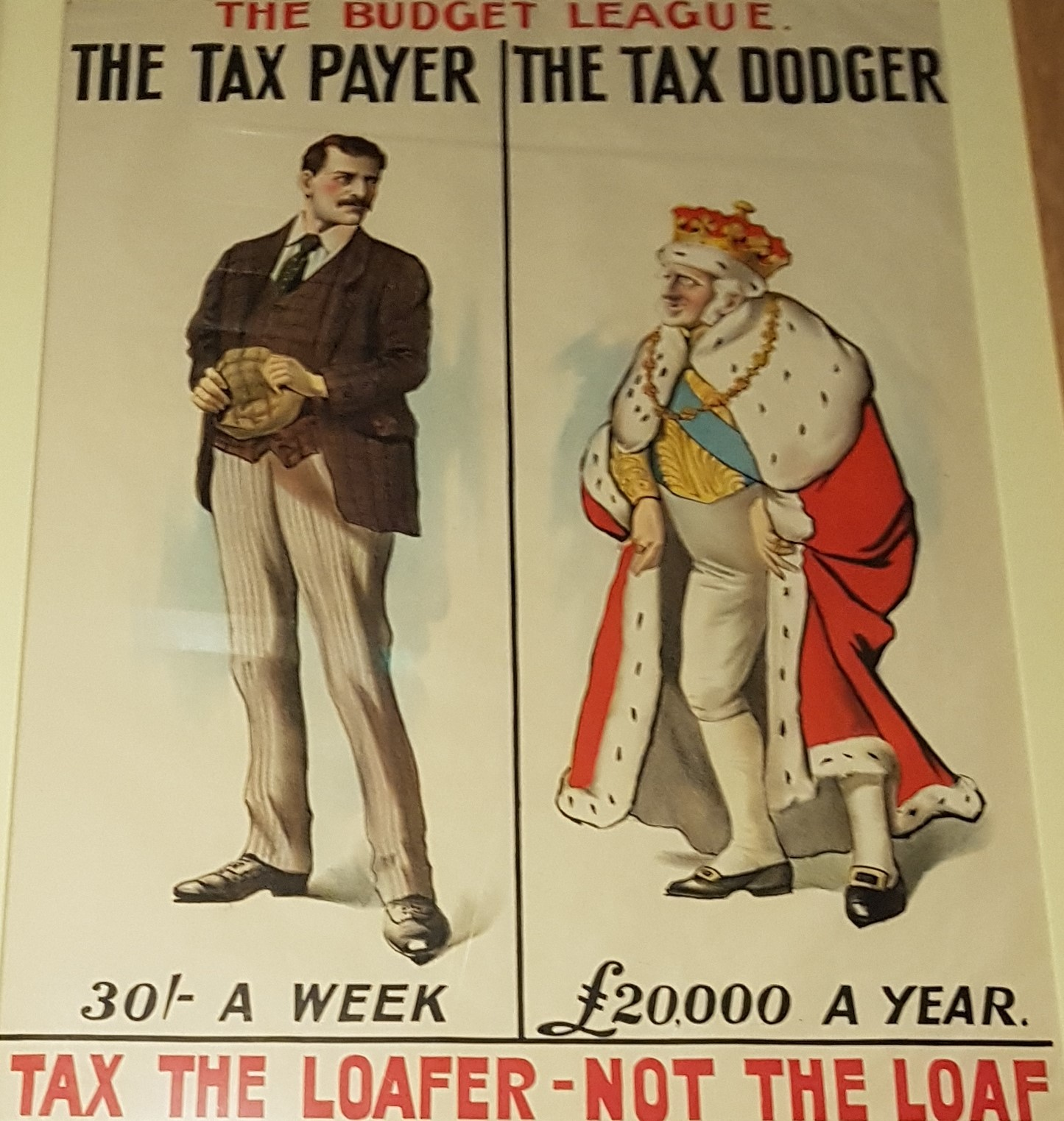
Tax the loafer not the loaf

The foundation of the League had not been discussed in the Cabinet and when Sir Henry Norman requested Cabinet ministers to speak at its meetings, nearly all of them refused to participate. However, after Jack Pease issued a circular to all Cabinet members, the League was able to announce that many leading Liberals would speak at its meetings.

A conference on 9 July between the League's executive committee and the editors of twenty four Liberal-supporting newspapers arranged the publication and press campaign of the League. Charles Masterman chaired a Literature Sub-committee to produce pamphlets, leaflets, cartoons and posters.

At a meeting of the League's executive on 21 July, they decided upon three classes of meetings; Class A would be addressed by Cabinet members and other government members; Class B by MPs and paid speakers of the party; and Class C by others, along with gramophone recordings of pro-Budget speeches by H. H. Asquith, Lloyd George and Churchill. Sir Henry claimed that "hundreds and thousands of people in humble circumstances, who could never possibly have cherished the hope, except by means of the gramophone, of hearing the Prime Minister" could now hear his words.

After the Finance Bill passed the Commons into the House of Lords in November, the League continued its publications and posters into the general election of January 1910, finally closing its office on 29 April 1910, the date that the People's Budget became law. The League staged 40 meetings addressed by Cabinet members and 115 by other members of the government. Between its first meeting on 9 July to 10 November, it staged 3,564 meetings with a total registered attendance of 1,436,827 people (approximately 1 in 5 of the registered electorate in Great Britain).
