= Birkenhead Sixth Form College =

Sixth form college in Wirral, England

Coordinates: 53.3949°N 3.0547°W

- College logo since 2013
- Type: Sixth form college
- Established: 1988
- Principal: Mike Kilbride MBE
- Deputy principal: Robert Myatt
- Location: Park Road West, Claughton, Birkenhead, CH43 8SQ; England
- Website: http://www.bsfc.ac.uk

Birkenhead Sixth Form College specialises in A Level & BTEC education and is rated as 'Outstanding' by Ofsted. In February 2018, TES FE Awards named the College UK 'Sixth Form College of the Year'.

The college prioritizes social mobility, with its dedication being recognised with national and regional awards. The Association of Colleges named Birkenhead Sixth Form College as the winner of their Beacon Award for Social Mobility and Widening Participation 2018/19, while the Sixth Form Colleges Association and Educate North awards have also recognised the college's commitment to social mobility with award wins.

Independent data analyst specialists Alps have placed Birkenhead Sixth Form College's A Level results in the top 10% nationally for student progression for the last four consecutive years, and progress scores in both A Levels and BTECs are consistently in the top in area-wide results.

More than 50% of results in summer 2019 were high grades of A*-B at A Level and Distinction* or Distinction at BTEC. Nearly 90% of students go on to university each year, with a quarter of that figure going to Russell Group universities. Many who go on to higher education are the first generation in their families to do so. Other graduates have gone on to prestigious apprenticeships with the likes of Unilever and Hill Dickinson.

== Location ==
Birkenhead Sixth Form College is situated in Claughton Village, near Birkenhead Park on the Wirral peninsula. Birkenhead Park railway station is situated nearby and a variety of local bus routes serve the area.

== Facilities ==
Birkenhead Sixth Form College underwent a £3.5 million refurbishment which was completed in 2014. This saw the addition of:

- New School of Art and Design
- New Humanities building
- New science laboratories
- New learning support area
- 8SQ student refectory and canteen
- New reception and frontage

The refurbishment was led by Rachel Clegg, a former student of Birkenhead Sixth Form College who is now a practising architect.
