= John Charmley =

British historian (1955–2025)

John Denis Charmley FRHistS
- Born: 8 November 1955; Birkenhead, England
- Died: 12 May 2025 (aged 69); Harleston, Norfolk, England
- Occupations: Academic, author
- Spouse: Rachel Heap (m. 2004)
- Children: 3

Academic background
- Education: Rock Ferry High School
- Alma mater: Pembroke College, Oxford
- Thesis: British policy towards de Gaulle, 1942–1944 (1982)
- Influences: Maurice Cowling

Academic work
- Discipline: History
- Sub-discipline: Diplomatic history
- Institutions: University of East Anglia; St Mary's University, Twickenham

John Denis Charmley FRHistS (9 November 1955 – 12 May 2025) was a British academic and diplomatic historian. From 1979 he held various posts at the University of East Anglia: initially as Head of the School of History, then as the Head of the School of Music and most recently as the Head of the Institute for Interdisciplinary Humanities. From 2016 until his retirement in 2021 he was Pro-Vice-Chancellor for Academic strategy, then Provost, at St Mary's University, Twickenham. In this role he was responsible for initiating the University's Foundation Year Programme, reflecting Professor Charmley's commitment to widening educational access.

== Biography ==
Charmley was born on 9 November 1955 to Jack, a docker, and Doris, a barmaid. Later in life he reflected that he grew up in a household "without books". He was educated at Rock Ferry High School and won a scholarship to study at Pembroke College, Oxford (BA, 1977; DPhil, 1982). His doctoral thesis focused on wartime dealings between the British government and Charles de Gaulle. In 1979, three years before completing his doctorate, he was appointed to a lectureship at the University of East Anglia, where he would remain for the majority of his career.

Charmley was a man of "profound but eclectic faith", moving "from Methodism (Sunday school), Evangelism (verging on the Unitarian), high church Anglicanism, via English Coptic Orthodoxy, to deliverance as the very keenest of Catholic converts".

In 1977 Charmley married Ann Dorothea Bartlett, with whom he had three sons (two of them twins). Their marriage was dissolved in 1992. His second wife was Lorraine Fegan, and their marriage was dissolved in 2003. In 2004 he married Rachel Heap, acquiring two stepdaughters.

Charmley died in Harleston, Norfolk on 12 May 2025, at the age of 69.

== Views ==
Charmley sums up his verdict on the career of Winston Churchill in Churchill: The End of Glory:

Churchill stood for the British Empire, for British independence and for an 'anti-Socialist' vision of Britain. By July 1945 the first of these was on the skids, the second was dependent solely upon America and the third had just vanished in a Labour election victory.

He also tried to rehabilitate Neville Chamberlain. F. M. Leventhal, in a review of Chamberlain and the Lost Peace, suggested that while Charmley's work portrayed a courageous leader with "a deep and humane desire to leave no stone unturned to avoid war," Chamberlain's inability to recognise Hitler's ambition meant that "perhaps that is why Winston Churchill's reputation remains largely untarnished, while Chamberlain's, Charmley's initiative notwithstanding, cannot be resuscitated".

Charmley admitted that his books on Chamberlain and Churchill drew heavily from the work of Maurice Cowling, on occasion claiming to only have produced an "English translation" of Cowling's "syntactically impenetrable prose". He followed Cowling in arguing that appeasement was "the only sensible means of dealing with the European crisis" when the British military were underprepared for war and the British public were resistant to it.

== Criticism ==
Some historians argue that it is difficult to blame the fall of the British Empire on Churchill, as it was exceedingly likely to fall anyway. Scholars also find the idea of a truce with Germany unwise at best, as Richard M. Langworth wrote:

Every serious military account of the Second World War shows that Germany came within a hair of taking Russia out even as it was. With no enemy at his back, tying up materiel and divisions in the West; without Britain's campaign in Africa; without the Americans and British succoring Stalin by sea; without Roosevelt's courting war with Germany in the Atlantic, Hitler would have thrown everything he had into Russia. The siege of Leningrad, the attack on Moscow, the battle of Stalingrad would almost certainly have gone the other way, if not in 1941 then certainly by 1942.

A more general critique of the idea of making peace with Germany comes from Manfred Weidhorn:

Prudential (albeit immoral) as that solution might have been, the critics assume that (1) Hitler would deal; (2) the British Coalition government would let Churchill deal; (3) Hitler would be faithful to the deal; (4) Russia would have gone under; (5) America would keep out; (6) The British Empire still had a long way to go; (7) a Britain tied to Hitler would have remained democratic; (8) American hegemony is bad. As Langworth, Smith, et al. point out, most of these Charmley assumptions (1–3, 6–8) are dubious.

Military historian Correlli Barnett calls it "absurd ... that instead of going to war Britain could, and should, have lived with Wilhelmine Germany's domination of western Europe. This is glibly clever but actually preposterous as his claim ... that Britain could and should have unilaterally withdrawn into neutrality in 1940–41".

== Books ==
- John Charmley, Duff Cooper (Weidenfeld & Nicolson, 1986). ISBN 0-297-78857-4.
- John Charmley, Lord Lloyd and the Decline of the British Empire (Weidenfeld & Nicolson, 1987). ISBN 0-297-79205-9.
- John Charmley, Chamberlain and the Lost Peace (Hodder & Stoughton, 1989). ISBN 978-0-929587-33-2.
- John Charmley, Churchill: The End of Glory. A Political Biography (Hodder & Stoughton, 1993). ISBN 978-1-56663-247-8.
- John Charmley, Churchill's Grand Alliance: The Anglo-American Special Relationship 1940–57 (Hodder & Stoughton, 1995). ISBN 978-0-15-127581-6.
- John Charmley, A History of Conservative Politics 1900–1996 (Macmillan, 1996). ISBN 0-333-72283-3.
- John Charmley, Splendid Isolation?: Britain and the Balance of Power 1874–1914 (Hodder & Stoughton, 1999). ISBN 978-0-340-65791-1.
- John Charmley, The Princess and the Politicians: Sex, Intrigue and Diplomacy, 1812–40 (Viking, 2005). ISBN 0-670-88964-4.
- John Charmley, A History of Conservative Politics since 1830. (Palgrave Macmillan, 2008). ISBN 978-0-333-92973-5.

== Articles ==
- John Charmley, "Chamberlain, Churchill and the End of Empire" in The Decline of Empires. (Wein, 2001). ISBN 3-7028-0384-X.
- John Charmley, "Palmerston: Artful Old Dodger or Babe of Grace?" in The Makers of British Foreign Policy from Pitt to Thatcher. (Palgrave Macmillan, 2002). ISBN 0-333-91579-8.
- John Charmley, "What if Halifax Had Become Prime Minister in 1940?" in Prime Minister Portillo and Other Things that Never Happened: A Collection of Political Counterfactuals. (Portico's, 2003). ISBN 1-84275-069-0.
- John Charmley, "From Splendid Isolation to Finest Hour: Britain as a Global Power, 1900–1950" in The Foreign Office and British Diplomacy in the Twentieth Century (Routledge, 2005). ISBN 0-7146-5679-8.
- John Charmley, "Unravelling Silk: Princess Lieven, Metternich and Castlereagh" in A Living Anachronism? European Diplomacy and the Habsburg Monarchy. (Bohlau: Vienna, 2010). pp. 15–29. ISBN 978-3-205-78510-1.
- John Charmley, "Neville Chamberlain and the Consequences of the Churchillian Hegemony" in Origins of the Second World War: An International Perspective. (Continuum, 2011). p. 448. ISBN 978-1-4411-6443-8.
