= Greenwich =

Town in south-east London, United Kingdom

Coordinates: 51.48°N 0.00°E

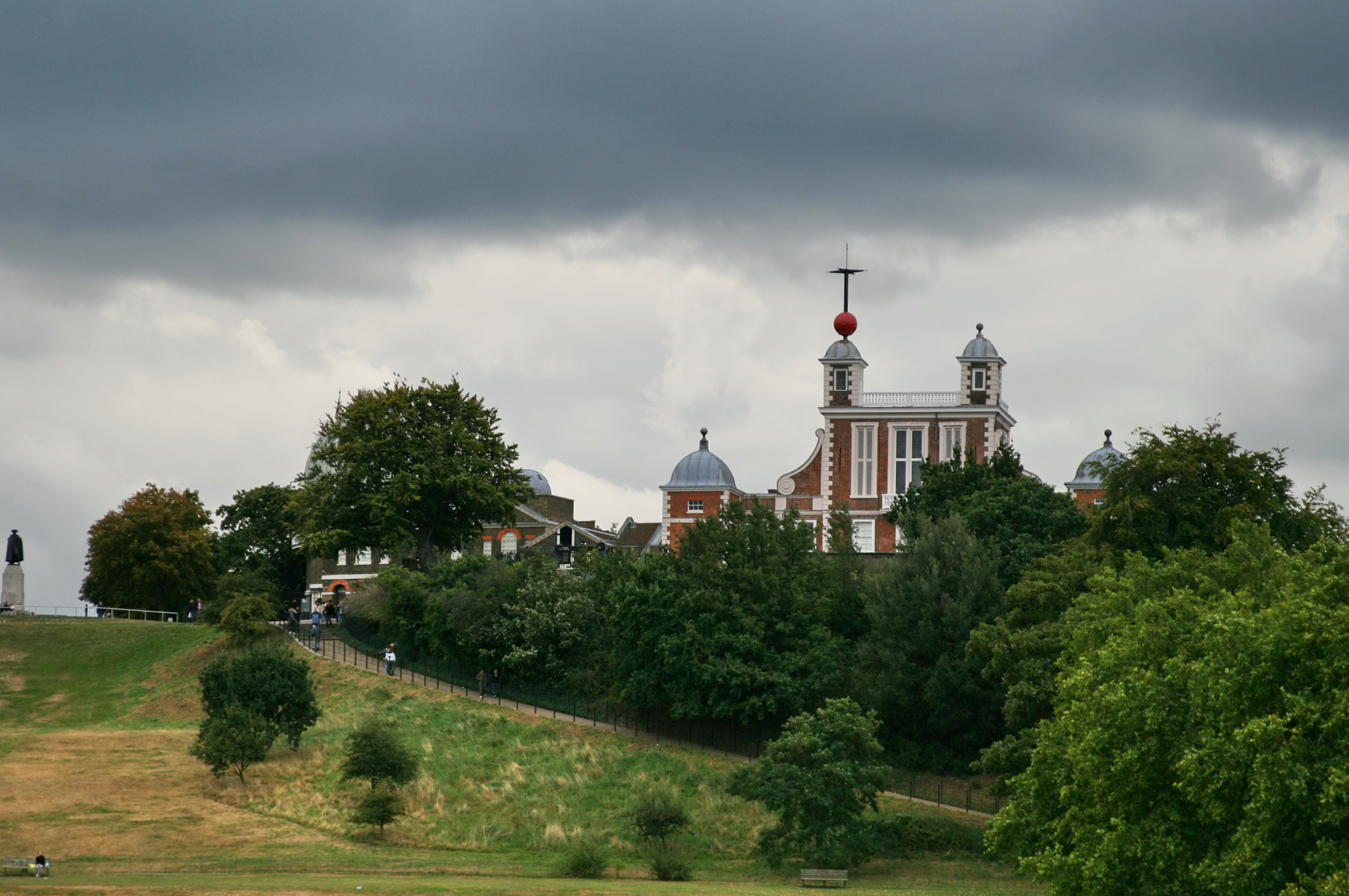
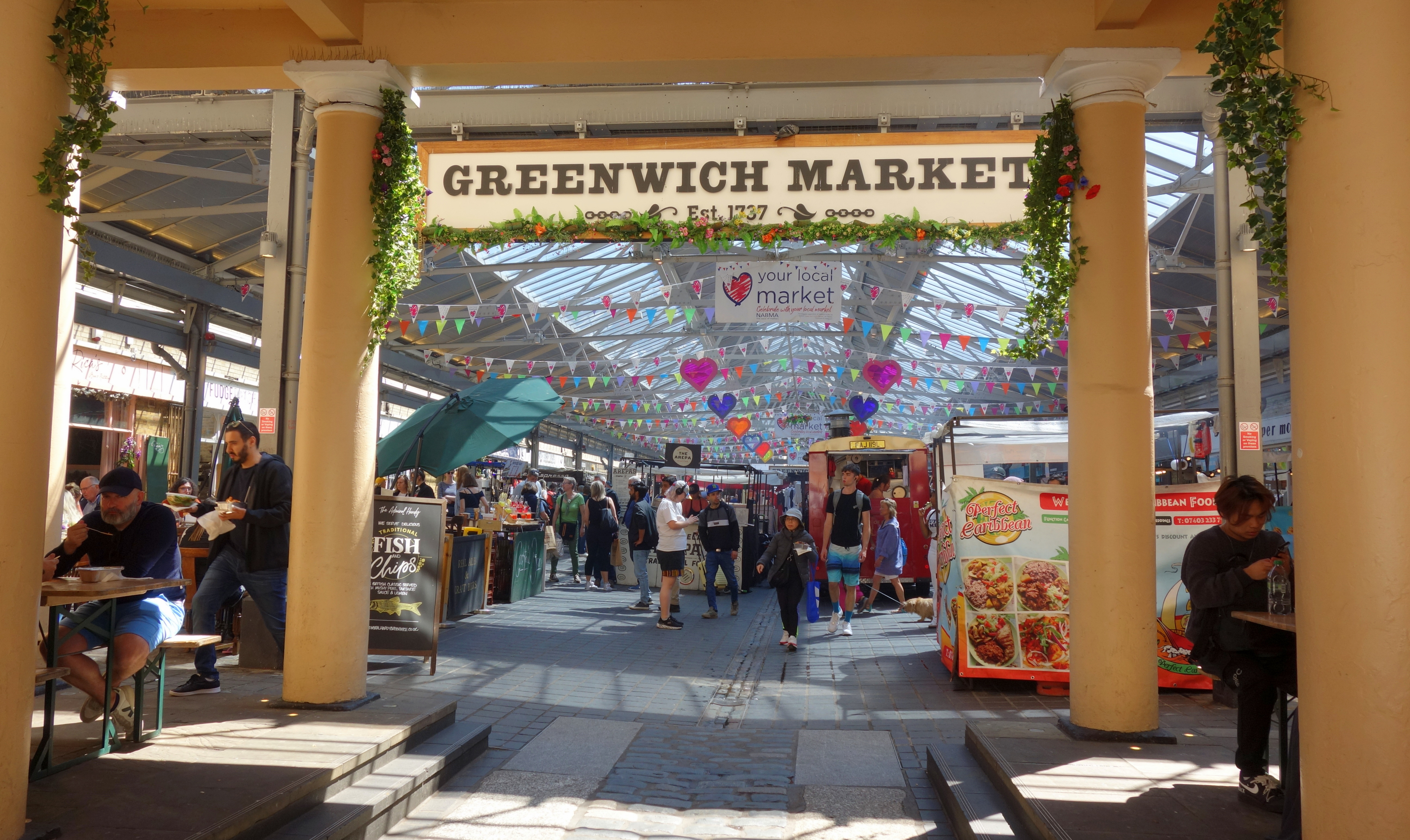
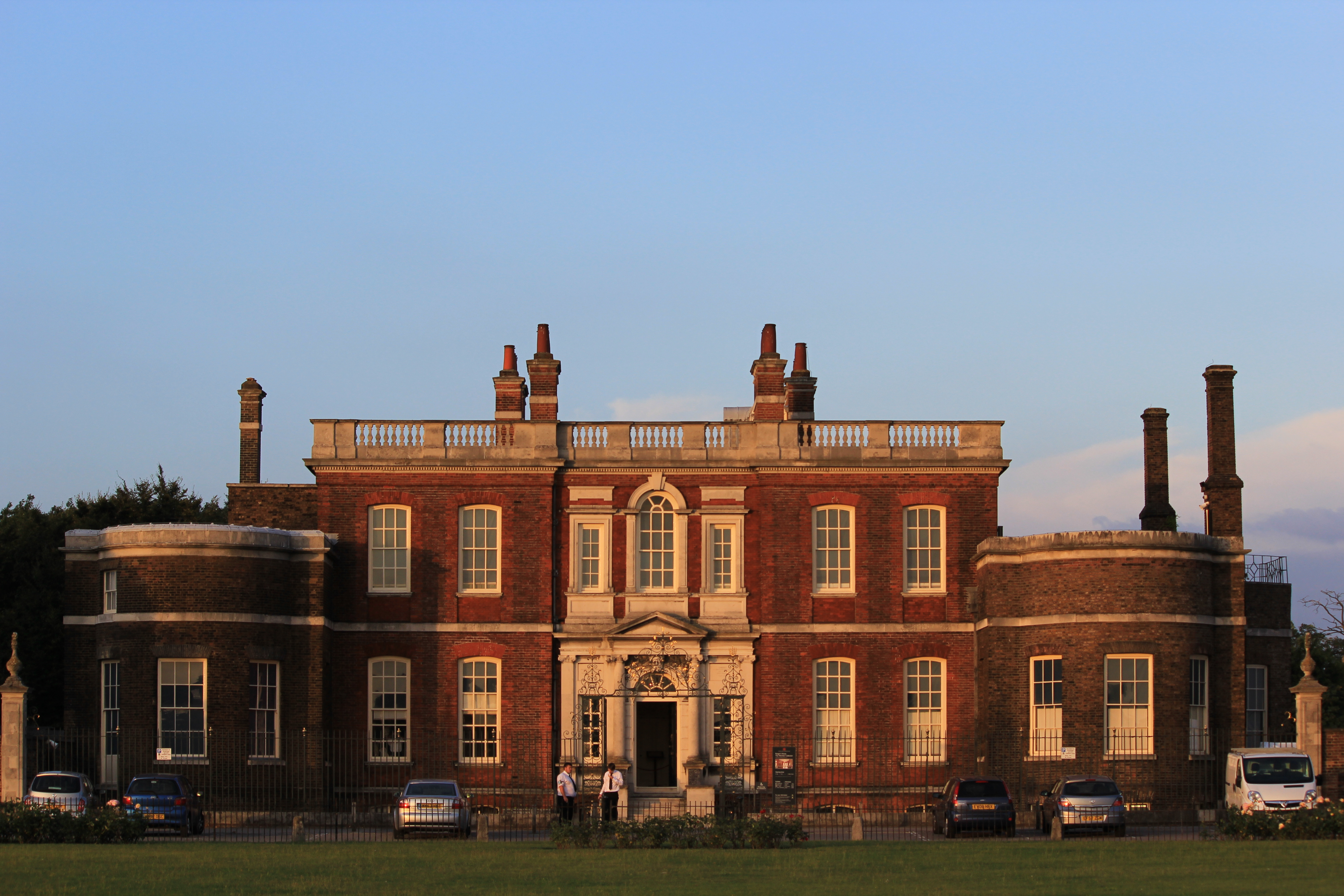
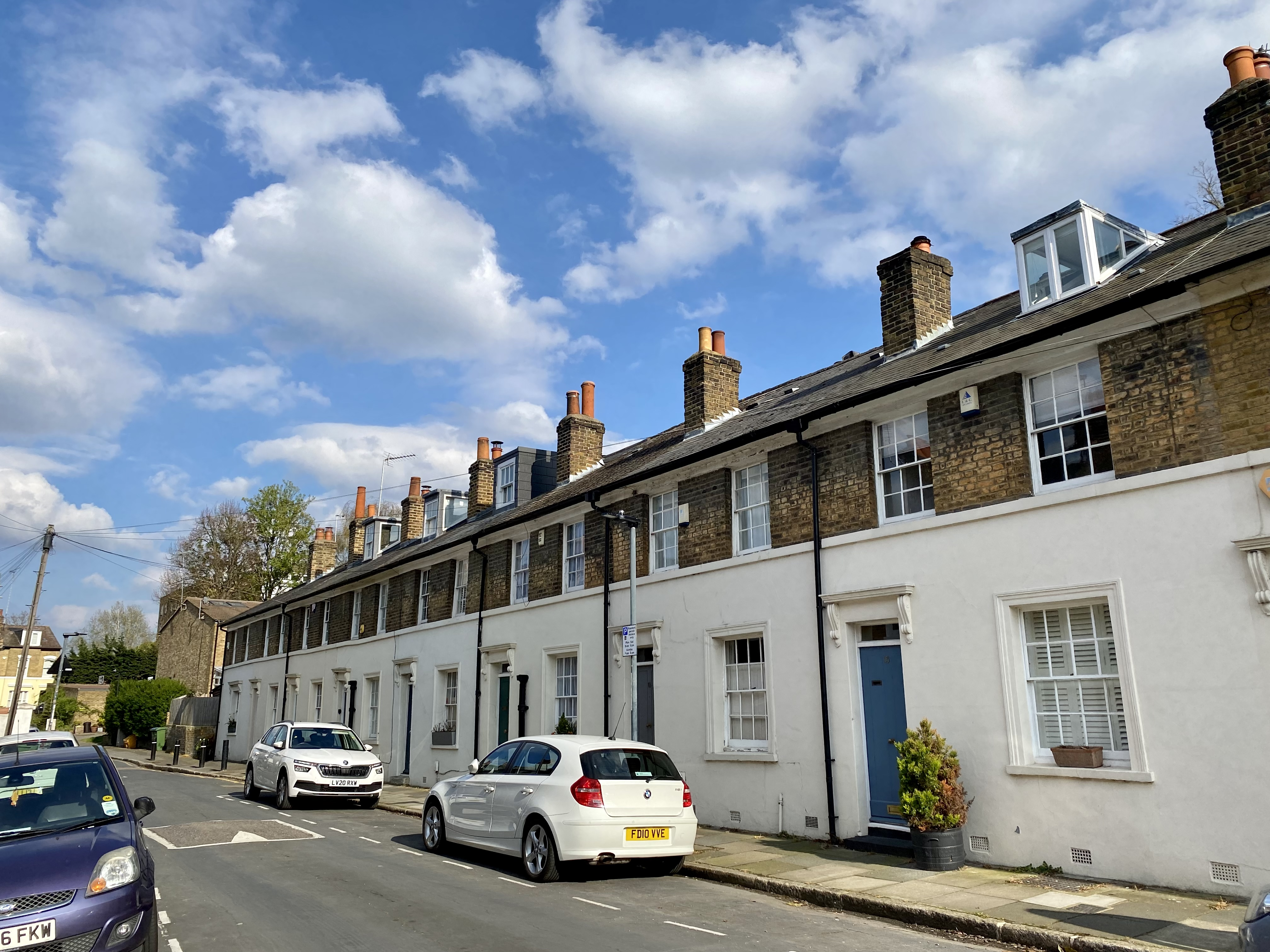
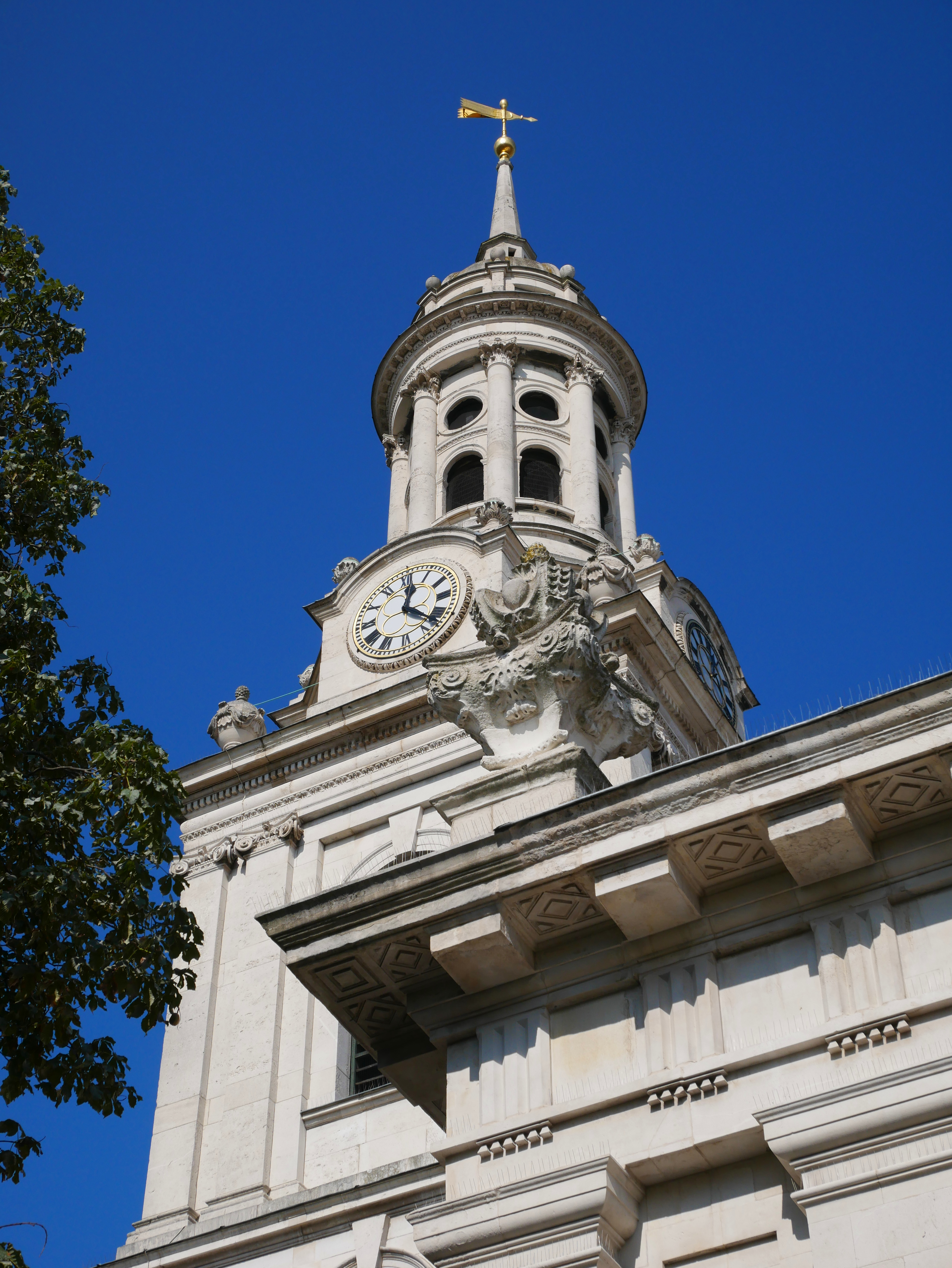
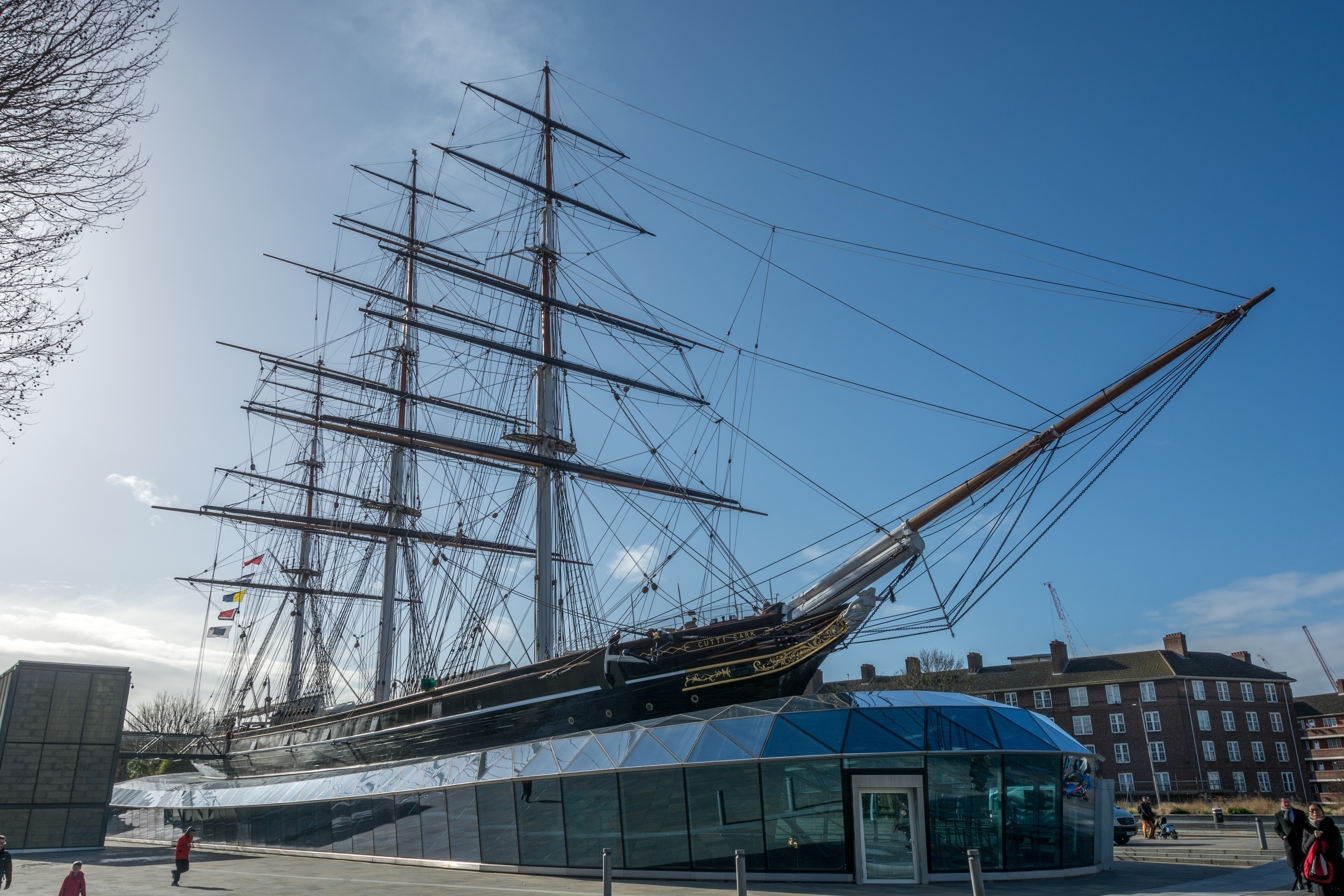
- Royal Naval College seen from the Thames Royal Observatory Greenwich Market Ranger's House Victorian terraces St Alfege Church Cutty Sark

- Location within Greater London
- Population: 30,578 (Peninsula and Greenwich West wards 2011)
- OS grid reference: TQ395775
  - Charing Cross: 5.5 mi (8.9 km) WNW
- London borough: Greenwich
- Ceremonial county: Greater London
- Region: London
- Country: England
- Sovereign state: United Kingdom
- Post town: LONDON
- Postcode district: SE10
- Dialling code: 020
- Police: Metropolitan
- Fire: London
- Ambulance: London
- UK Parliament: Greenwich and Woolwich
- London Assembly: Greenwich and Lewisham

UNESCO World Heritage Site
- Official name: Maritime Greenwich
- Includes: Royal Naval College, Queen's House, Royal Observatory, Cutty Sark
- Criteria: Cultural: i, ii, iv, vi
- Reference: 795
- Inscription: 1997 (21st Session)
- Area: 109.5 hectares (271 acres)
- Buffer zone: 174.85 hectares (432.1 acres)

National Register of Historic Parks and Gardens
- Official name: Greenwich Park
- Designated: 1 October 1987
- Reference no.: 1000174

Greenwich (/ˈɡrɛnɪtʃ/ GREN-itch, /-ɪdʒ/ -ij, /ˈɡrɪn-/ GRIN-) is an affluent area in south-east London, England, within the Royal Borough of Greenwich and the ceremonial county of Greater London, 5.5 miles (8.9 km) east-south-east of Charing Cross. It contains the UNESCO World Heritage Site of Maritime Greenwich.

Greenwich is notable for its astronomical and maritime history and for giving its name to the Greenwich Meridian (0° longitude) and Greenwich Mean Time. The town became the site of a royal palace, the Palace of Placentia, from the 15th century and was the birthplace of many Tudors, including Henry VIII and Elizabeth I. The palace fell into disrepair during the English Civil War and was demolished, eventually being replaced by the Royal Naval Hospital for Sailors, designed by Sir Christopher Wren and his assistant Nicholas Hawksmoor. These buildings became the Royal Naval College in 1873, and they remained a military education establishment until 1998, when they passed into the hands of the Greenwich Foundation. The historic rooms within these buildings remain open to the public; other buildings are used by the University of Greenwich and Trinity Laban Conservatoire of Music and Dance.

The town became a popular resort in the 18th century, and many grand houses were built there, such as Vanbrugh Castle (1717) on Maze Hill and the Ranger's House (1722) near Blackheath. From the Georgian period estates of houses were constructed above the town centre. The maritime connections of Greenwich were celebrated in the 20th century, with the siting of the historic vessels Cutty Sark and Gipsy Moth IV next to the river front, and the National Maritime Museum in the former buildings of the Royal Hospital School in 1934.

Historically an ancient parish in the Blackheath Hundred of Kent, the town formed part of the growing conurbation of Victorian London in the 19th century. When the County of London, an administrative area designed to replace the Metropolitan Board of Works, was formed in 1889, the parish merged with those of Charlton-next-Woolwich, Deptford St Nicholas and Kidbrooke to create the Metropolitan Borough of Greenwich. When local government in London was again reformed in 1965, it merged with most of the Metropolitan Borough of Woolwich, creating what is now the Royal Borough of Greenwich, a local authority district of Greater London.

== History ==
=== Toponymy ===
The place-name 'Greenwich' is first attested in an Anglo-Saxon charter of 918, where it appears as Gronewic. It is recorded as Grenewic in 964, and as Grenawic in the Anglo-Saxon Chronicle for 1013. It is Grenviz in the Domesday Book of 1086, and Grenewych in the Taxatio Ecclesiastica of 1291. The name means 'green wic', indicating that Greenwich was what is known as a -wich town or emporium, from the Latin 'vicus'.

The settlement later became known as East Greenwich to distinguish it from West Greenwich or Deptford Strond, the part of Deptford adjacent to the River Thames, but the use of East Greenwich to mean the whole of the town of Greenwich died out in the 19th century. However, Greenwich was divided into the registration subdistricts of Greenwich East and Greenwich West from the beginning of civil registration in 1837, the boundary running down what is now Greenwich Church Street and Croom's Hill, although more modern references to "East" and "West" Greenwich probably refer to the areas east and west of the Royal Naval College and National Maritime Museum corresponding with the West Greenwich council ward. An article in The Times of 13 October 1967 stated:

East Greenwich, gateway to the Blackwall Tunnel, remains solidly working class, the manpower for one eighth of London's heavy industry. West Greenwich is a hybrid: the spirit of Nelson, the Cutty Sark, the Maritime Museum, an industrial waterfront and a number of elegant houses, ripe for development.

==== Manor of East Greenwich ====
Royal charters granted to English colonists in North America, as well as in Company Bombay and St Helena, often used the name of the manor of East Greenwich for describing the tenure (from the Latin verb teneo, hold) as that of free socage. New England charters provided that the grantees should hold their lands "as of his Majesty's manor of East Greenwich". This was in relation to the principle of land tenure under English law, that the ruling monarch (king or queen) was paramount lord of all the soil in the terra regis, while all others held their lands, directly or indirectly, under the monarch. Land outside the physical boundaries of England, as in America, was treated as belonging constructively to one of the existing royal manors, and from Tudor times grants frequently used the name of the manor of East Greenwich, but some 17th-century grants named the castle of Windsor. Places in North America that have taken the name "East Greenwich" include a township in Gloucester County, New Jersey, a hamlet in Washington County, New York, and a town in Kent County, Rhode Island. Greenwich, Connecticut was also named after Greenwich.

=== Early settlement ===
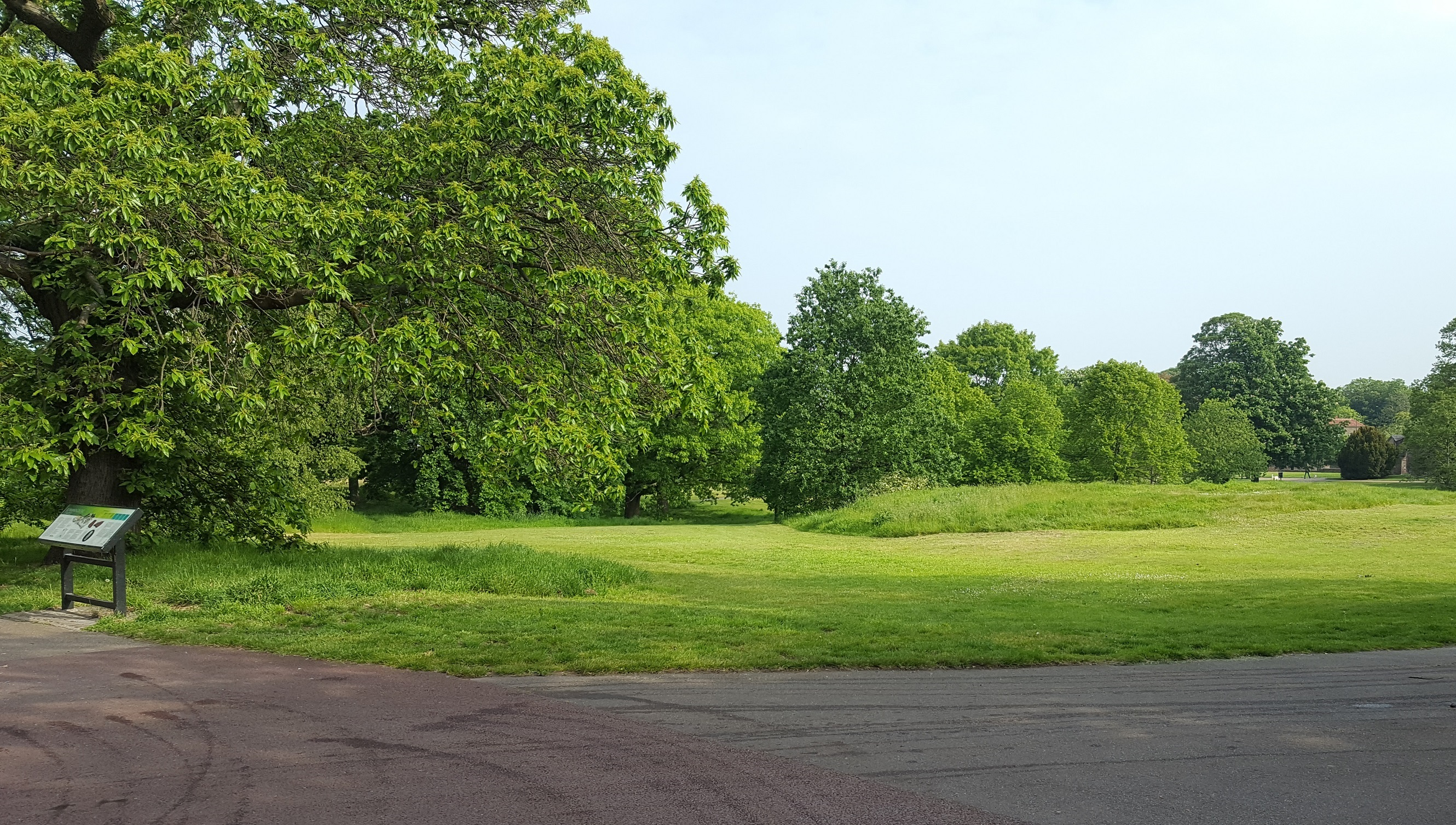
Prehistoric burial mounds in Greenwich Park

Tumuli to the south-west of Flamsteed House, in Greenwich Park, are thought to be early Bronze Age barrows re-used by the Saxons in the 6th century as burial grounds. To the east between the Vanbrugh and Maze Hill Gates is the site of a Roman villa or temple. A small area of red paving tesserae protected by railings marks the spot. It was excavated in 1902, and 300 coins were found dating from the emperors Claudius and Honorius to the 5th century. This was excavated by the Channel 4 television programme Time Team in 1999, broadcast in 2000, and further investigations were made by the same group in 2003.

The Roman road from London to Dover, Watling Street, crossed the high ground to the south of Greenwich, through Blackheath. This followed the line of an earlier Celtic route from Canterbury to St Albans. As late as Henry V, Greenwich was only a fishing town, with a safe anchorage in the river.

=== Viking ===
During the reign of Æthelred the Unready, the Danish fleet anchored in the River Thames off Greenwich for over three years, and the army encamped on the hill above. From here they attacked Kent and, in the year 1012, took the city of Canterbury, making Archbishop Alphege their prisoner for seven months in their camp at Greenwich, at that time within the county of Kent. They stoned him to death for his refusal to allow his ransom (3,000 pieces of silver) to be paid; and kept his body, until the reported blossoming of a stick that had been immersed in his blood. For this miracle his body was released to his followers, he achieved sainthood for his martyrdom and, in the 12th century, the parish church was dedicated to him. The present church on the site west of the town centre is St Alfege's Church, designed by Nicholas Hawksmoor in 1714 and completed in 1718.

=== Norman ===
The Domesday Book of 1086 records the manor of Grenviz in the hundred of Grenviz as held by Bishop Odo of Bayeux; his lands were seized by the crown in 1082. The name of the hundred was changed to Blackheath when the site of the hundred court was moved there in the 12th century. There has been a royal palace or hunting lodge here since before 1300, when Edward I is known to have made offerings at the chapel of the Virgin Mary.

=== Plantagenet ===
Subsequent monarchs were regular visitors, with Henry IV making his will here, and Henry V granting the manor, for life, to Thomas Beaufort, Duke of Exeter, who died at Greenwich in 1426. The palace was created by Humphrey, Duke of Gloucester, Henry V's younger brother and regent to his son Henry VI in 1447; he enclosed the park and erected a tower (Greenwich Castle) on the hill now occupied by the Royal Observatory. The Thames-side palace was renamed the Palace of Placentia or Pleasaunce by Henry VI's consort Margaret of Anjou after Humphrey's death. The palace was completed and further enlarged by Edward IV, and in 1466 it was granted to his queen, Elizabeth. Edward IV had previously been given permission by the Pope to establish a Franciscan friary of Observant Friars in Greenwich, this was done in 1485, two years after his death; the first Observant House in England, it was located on land adjacent to the palace. After rejecting papal authority in 1534, the Franciscan Observants were suppressed; refounded as Franciscan Conventual, the friary was dissolved in 1538, then re-established in 1555 for Observants, before the friars were finally expelled in 1559 and the friary was demolished in 1662.

Ultimately it was because the palace and its grounds were a royal possession (with a useful hill) that it was chosen as the site for Charles II's Royal Observatory, from which stemmed Greenwich's subsequent global role as originator of the modern prime meridian.

=== Tudor ===
The palace was the principal residence of Henry VII whose sons Henry (later Henry VIII) and Edmund Tudor were born here, and baptised in St Alphege's. Henry favoured Greenwich over nearby Eltham Palace, the former principal royal palace in south London, which was not on the River Thames and so was less accessible. Henry extended Greenwich Palace and it became his principal London seat until Whitehall Palace was built in the 1530s. Henry VIII married Catherine of Aragon and Anne of Cleves at Greenwich, and both of his daughters, Mary (18 February 1516) and Elizabeth (7 September 1533), were born at Greenwich. His son Edward VI also died there at age 15.

The palace of Placentia, in turn, became Elizabeth's favourite summer residence. Both she and her sister Mary used the palace extensively, and Elizabeth's Council planned the Spanish Armada campaign there in 1588.

=== Stuart ===
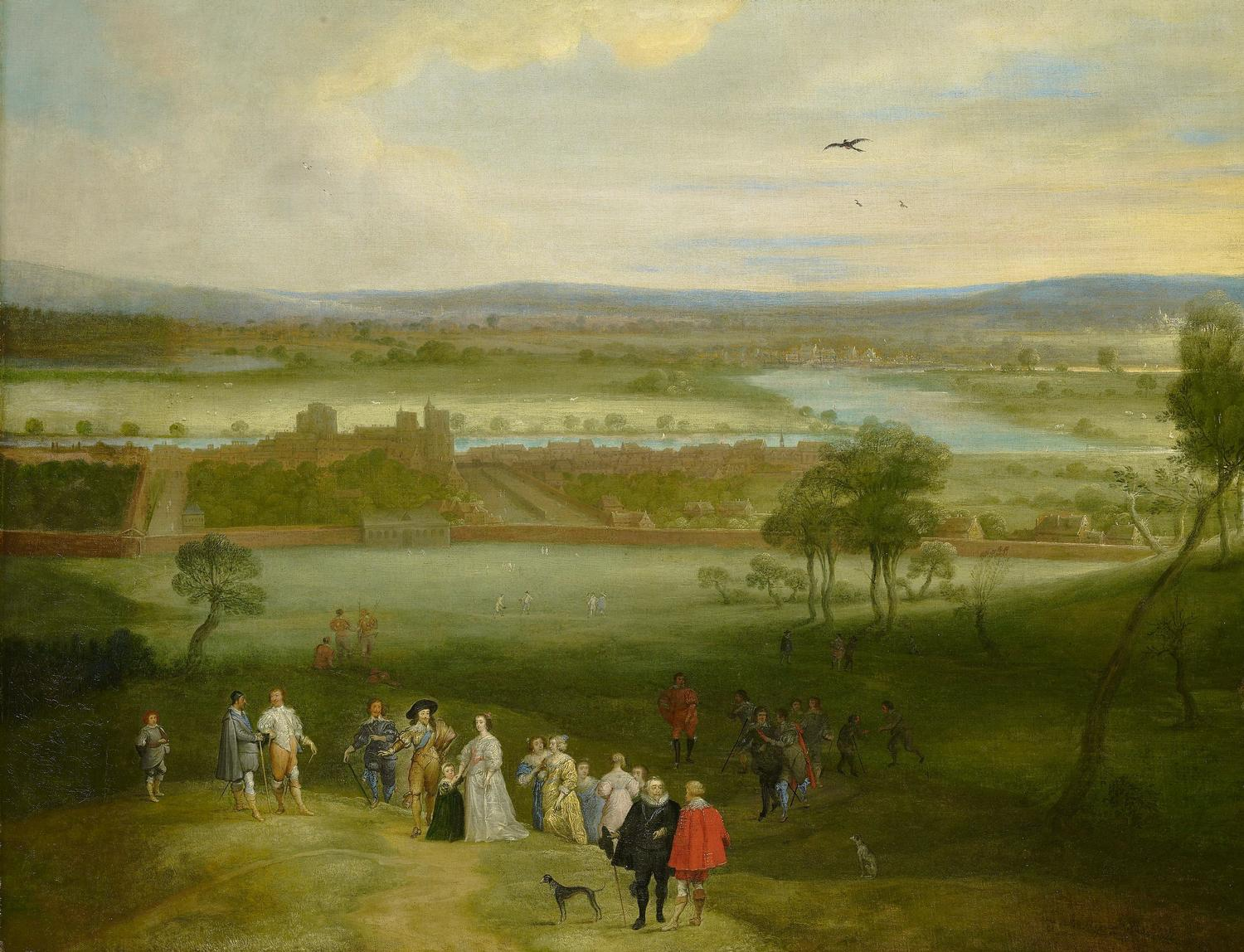
Adriaen van Stalbemt's A View of Greenwich, c. 1632, showing King Charles I (in the black hat) and his family. Greenwich Palace can be seen in front of the River Thames behind them. Royal Collection, London.

James I carried out the final remodelling work on Greenwich Palace, granting the manor to his wife Queen Anne of Denmark. In 1616 Anne commissioned Inigo Jones to design and build the surviving Queen's House as the final addition to the palace.

Charles I granted the manor to his wife Queen Henrietta Maria, for whom Inigo Jones completed the Queen's House. During the English Civil War, the palace was used as a biscuit factory and prisoner-of-war camp. Then, in the Interregnum, the palace and park were seized to become a 'mansion' for the Lord Protector.

By the time of the Restoration, the Palace of Placentia had fallen into disuse and was pulled down. New buildings began to be established as a grand palace for Charles II, but only the King Charles block was completed. Charles II also redesigned and replanted Greenwich Park and founded and built the Royal Observatory.

Prince James (later King James II & VII), as Duke of York and Lord High Admiral until 1673, was often at Greenwich with his brother Charles and, according to Samuel Pepys, he proposed the idea of creating a Royal Naval Hospital. This was eventually established at Greenwich by his daughter Mary II, who in 1692–1693 commissioned Christopher Wren to design the Royal Hospital for Seamen (now the Old Royal Naval College). The work was begun under her widower William III in 1696 and completed by Hawksmoor. Queen Anne and Prince George of Denmark continued to patronise the project.

=== Hanoverian ===
George I landed at Greenwich from Hanover on his accession in 1714. His successor George II granted the Royal Hospital for Seamen the forfeited estates of the Jacobite Earl of Derwentwater, which allowed the building to be completed by 1751.

In 1805, George III granted the Queen's House to the Royal Naval Asylum (an orphanage school), which amalgamated in 1821–1825 with the Greenwich Hospital School. Extended with the buildings that now house the National Maritime Museum, it was renamed the Royal Hospital School by Queen Victoria in 1892.

George IV donated nearly 40 paintings to the hospital in 1824, at a stroke creating a gallery in the Painted Hall. These now form the Greenwich Hospital Collection at the National Maritime Museum. Subsequently, William IV and Queen Adelaide were both regular donors and visitors to the gallery.

=== Victorian and Edwardian ===
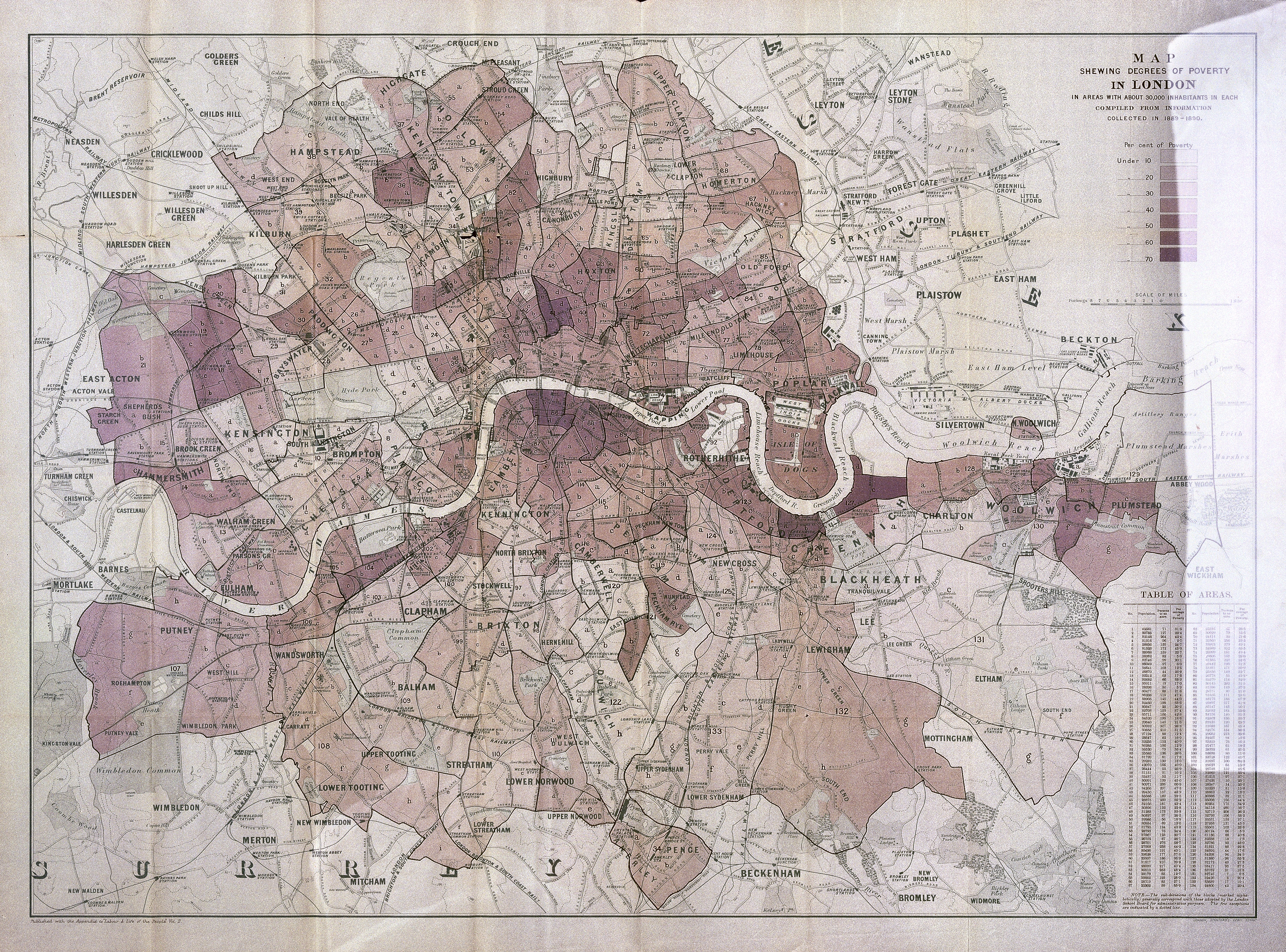
In the 1880s, if this place is so cut into three: east, central and west zones of about 30,000 inhabitants each, the central one had less than 10% recognisable poverty, the minimum of London's map above, but the others (east and west) more than 40%.

Queen Victoria rarely visited Greenwich, but in 1845 her husband Prince Albert personally bought Nelson's Trafalgar coat for the Naval Gallery.

In 1838 the London and Greenwich Railway (L&GR) completed the first steam railway in London. It started at London Bridge and had its terminus at London Street (now Greenwich High Road). It was also the first to be built specifically for passengers, and the first elevated railway, having 878 arches over its almost four mile stretch. South of the railway's viaduct over Deptford Creek is a Victorian pumping station constructed in 1864 as part of Joseph Bazalgette's London sewerage system (the Southern Outfall Sewer flows under Greenwich town centre).

In 1853 the local Scottish Presbyterian community built a church, St Mark's, nearby which was extended twice in the 1860s during the ministry of Adolph Saphir, eventually accommodating 1,000 worshippers.

In 1864 opposite the railway terminus, theatrical entrepreneur Sefton Parry built the thousand-seater New Greenwich Theatre. William Morton was one of its more successful managers. The theatre was demolished in 1937 to make way for a new Town Hall, now a listed building under new ownership and renamed Meridian House.

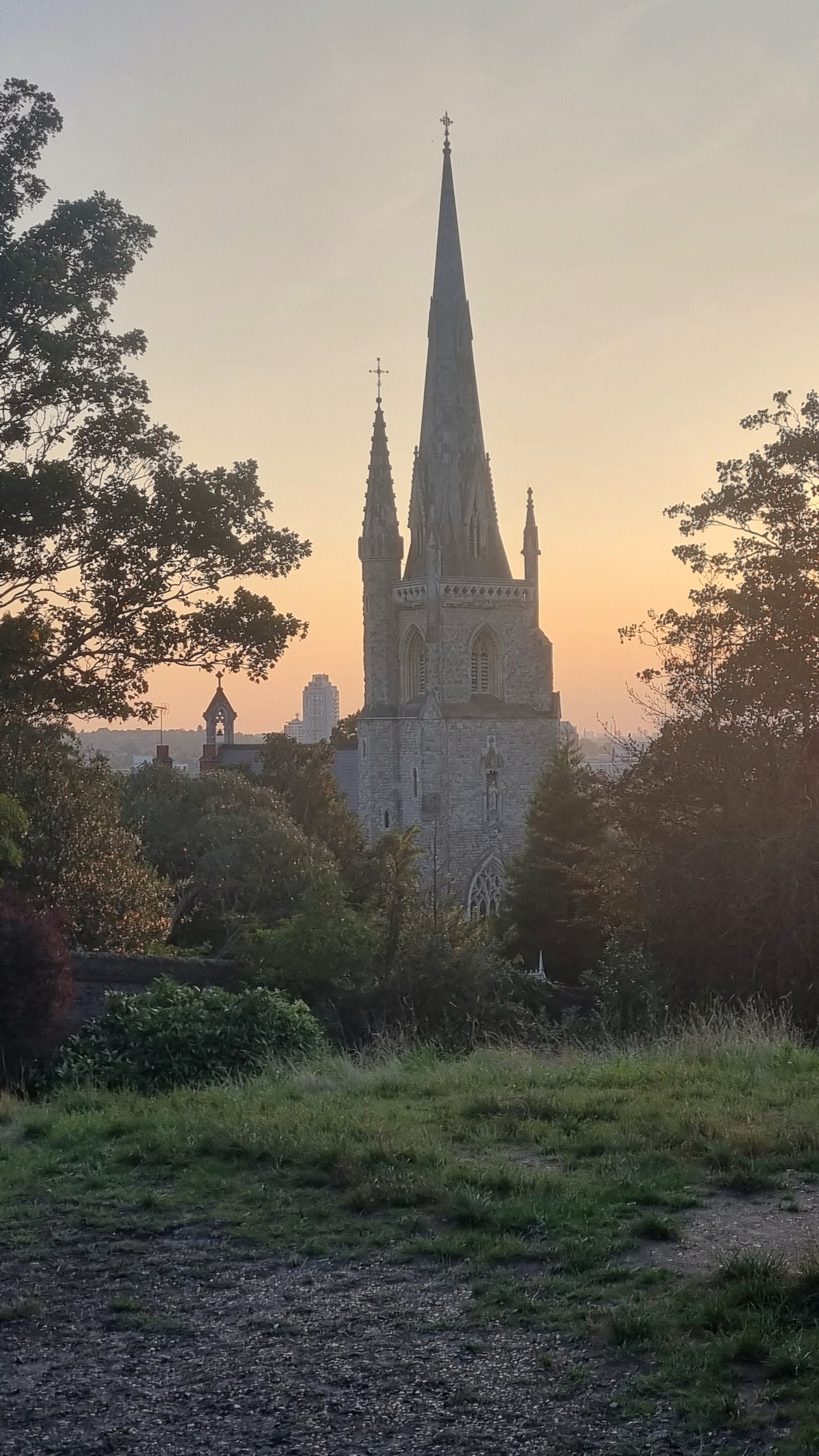
Our Ladye Star of the Sea

Greenwich Station is at the northern apex of the Ashburnham Triangle, a residential estate developed by the Ashburnham family, mainly between 1830 and 1870, on land previously developed as market gardens. It is now a designated conservation area. The present Greenwich Theatre, further to the east, on Croom's Hill, was constructed inside the shell of a Victorian music hall. Beginning life in 1855 as an annexe to the Rose and Crown, the music hall was rebuilt in 1871 by Charles Crowder and subsequently operated under many names. Further south on Croom's Hill, the Roman Catholic church of Our Ladye Star of the Sea was opened in 1851.

The meridian was established in 1851.

=== Modern and the present ===
George V and his wife Queen Mary both supported the creation of the National Maritime Museum, and Mary presented the museum with many items.

Prince Albert, Duke of York (later George VI), laid the foundation stone of the new Royal Hospital School when it moved out to Holbrook, Suffolk. In 1937 his first public act as king, three weeks before his coronation, was to open the National Maritime Museum in the buildings vacated by the school. The king was accompanied by his mother Queen Mary, his wife Queen Elizabeth and Princess Elizabeth.

Princess Elizabeth and her consort Prince Philip, who had been ennobled Duke of Edinburgh and Baron Greenwich on marriage in 1947, made their first public and official visit to Greenwich in 1948 to receive the Freedom of the Borough for Philip. In the same year, he became a trustee of the National Maritime Museum. Prince Philip was a trustee for 52 years until 2000, when he became its first patron. The Duke of Edinburgh was also a patron of the Cutty Sark (which was opened by the Queen in 1957) from 1952.

During the Silver Jubilee of 1977, the Queen embarked at Greenwich for the Jubilee River Pageant. In 1987, she was aboard the P&O ship Pacific Princess when it moored alongside the Old Royal Naval College for the college's 150th-anniversary celebrations.

To mark the Diamond Jubilee of Elizabeth II, on 3 February 2012 the Borough of Greenwich became the fourth district and third London Borough to have Royal Borough status, the others being Kingston upon Thames, Kensington & Chelsea and Windsor & Maidenhead. The status was granted in recognition of the borough's historic links with the monarchy, the location of the Prime Meridian and its being a UNESCO World Heritage Site.

== Governance ==
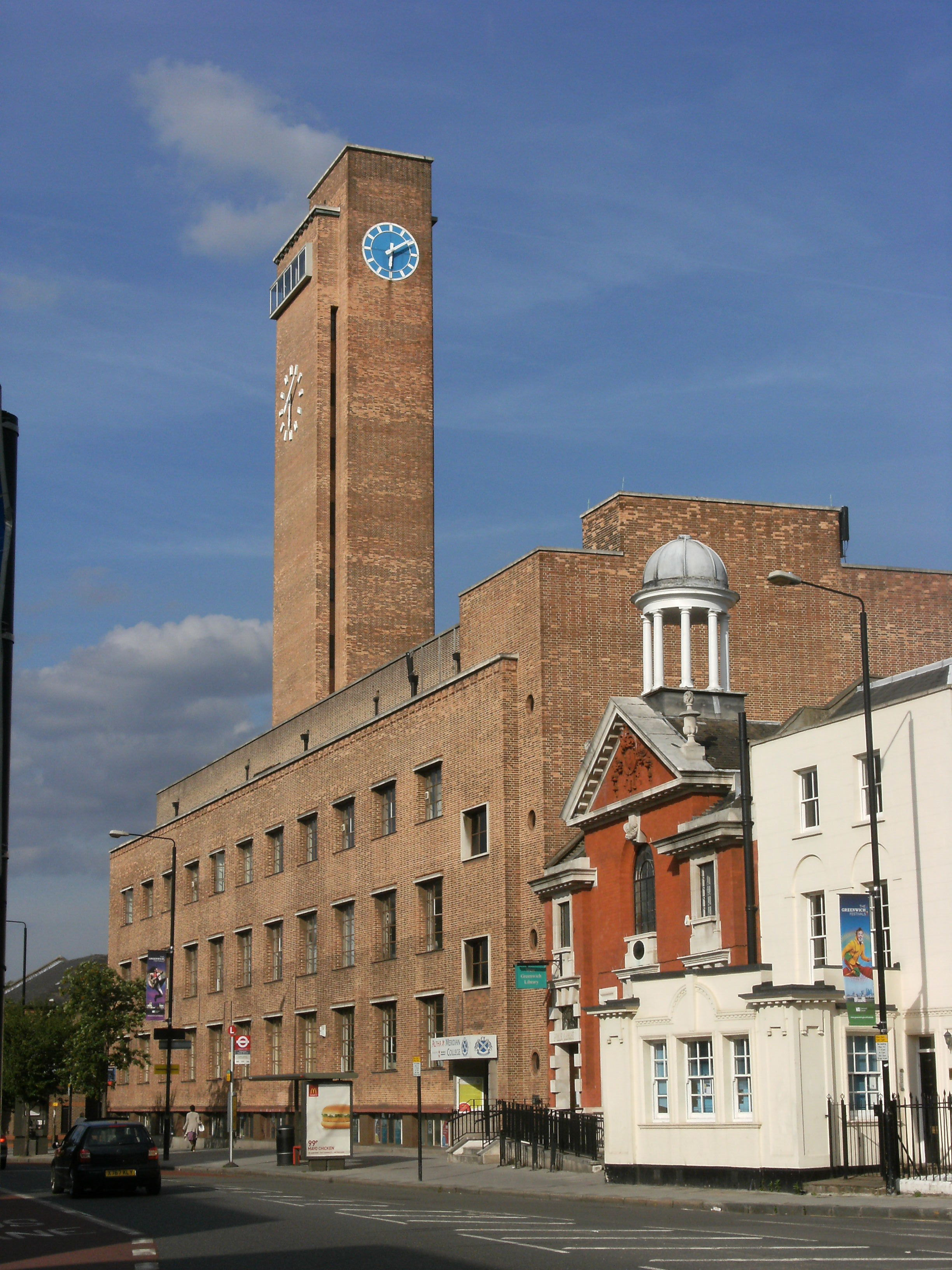
The former Greenwich Town Hall, now known as "Meridian House"

Greenwich is covered by the Greenwich West and Peninsula wards of the London Borough of Greenwich, which was formed in 1965 by merging the former Metropolitan Borough of Greenwich with that part of the Metropolitan Borough of Woolwich which lay south of the River Thames. Along with Blackheath Westcombe, Charlton, Glyndon, Woolwich Riverside, and Woolwich Common, it elects a member of parliament (MP) for Greenwich and Woolwich; Matthew Pennycook was elected as its MP in 2015 and later elections.

The London Borough of Greenwich became the Royal Borough of Greenwich to mark the Diamond Jubilee of Elizabeth II on 3 February 2012 due to the links of the borough with the royal family. Greenwich is represented in the Greenwich London Borough Council by the councillors of the Greenwich Park Ward, East Greenwich Ward, and the Greenwich Creekside Ward.

== Demographics ==
=== Ethnic groups ===
Ethnic composition (2011)
Ethnic group	Population	%
White	11,029	66.7
Black or Black British	2,393	14.5
Asian or Asian British	1,808	10.9
Mixed or Multiple ethnic groups	980	5.9
Other ethnic group	317	1.9
Total	16,527	100

In comparison with Greater London as a whole, West Greenwich has a relatively higher proportion of residents identifying as White, particularly White British, while still remaining ethnically diverse by national standards. The ward's Black or Black British population, especially those identifying as Black African, is broadly in line with or slightly above the London average, reflecting established African diaspora communities in south-east London. Asian or Asian British residents form a smaller share of the population than across London overall, although the proportion identifying as Chinese is comparatively notable. Mixed or Multiple ethnic groups are represented at similar levels to the London average, while the proportion of residents identifying with Other ethnic groups is slightly lower. Overall, the ethnic composition of West Greenwich reflects a more residential inner-London profile, combining a strong White British presence with significant minority communities.

=== Religion ===
Religion (2011)
Religion	Population	%
Christian	7,796	47.2
Buddhist	343	2.1
Hindu	297	1.8
Jewish	51	0.3
Muslim	885	5.4
Sikh	72	0.4
Other religion	90	0.5
No religion	5,624	34.0
Religion not stated	1,369	8.3
Total	16,527	100

Based on the 2011 census, the West Greenwich ward had a slightly higher proportion of residents identifying as Christian than Greater London overall, while the proportion reporting no religion was broadly similar. The share of residents identifying as Muslim was lower than the London average at that time, reflecting differences in the ward's demographic composition. Smaller religious groups, including Hindu, Buddhist, Jewish and Sikh communities, were present in proportions generally comparable with Greater London in 2011. As across London as a whole, a notable minority of residents in West Greenwich did not state a religious affiliation.

=== Employment ===
The employment profile of West Greenwich residents is characterised by a strong concentration in service-based industries, particularly financial and insurance activities due to the transport links to Canary Wharf and the City of London. Professional, scientific and technical services account for a higher proportion of employment than the London average. Education and human health and social work activities also represent significant shares of local employment, reflecting the presence of public and institutional employers. In contrast, sectors such as construction, wholesale and retail trade, and transport and storage employ a smaller proportion of residents in West Greenwich compared with Greater London overall. Employment in primary and industrial sectors, including agriculture, mining, manufacturing and utilities, remains minimal, consistent with the ward's urban character.

== Geography ==
=== Geography of Greenwich ===
The town of Greenwich is built on a broad platform to the south of the outside of a broad meander in the River Thames, with a safe deep water anchorage lying in the river. To the south, the land rises steeply, 100 feet (30 m) through Greenwich Park to the town of Blackheath. The higher areas consist of a sedimentary layer of gravelly soils, known as the Blackheath Beds, that spread through much of the south-east over a chalk outcrop—with sands, loam and seams of clay at the lower levels by the river.

Greenwich is bordered by Deptford Creek and Deptford to the west; the residential area of Westcombe Park to the east; the River Thames to the north; and the A2 and Blackheath to the south. The Greenwich Peninsula, northeast of the town centre and also known as North Greenwich, forms the main projection of the town.

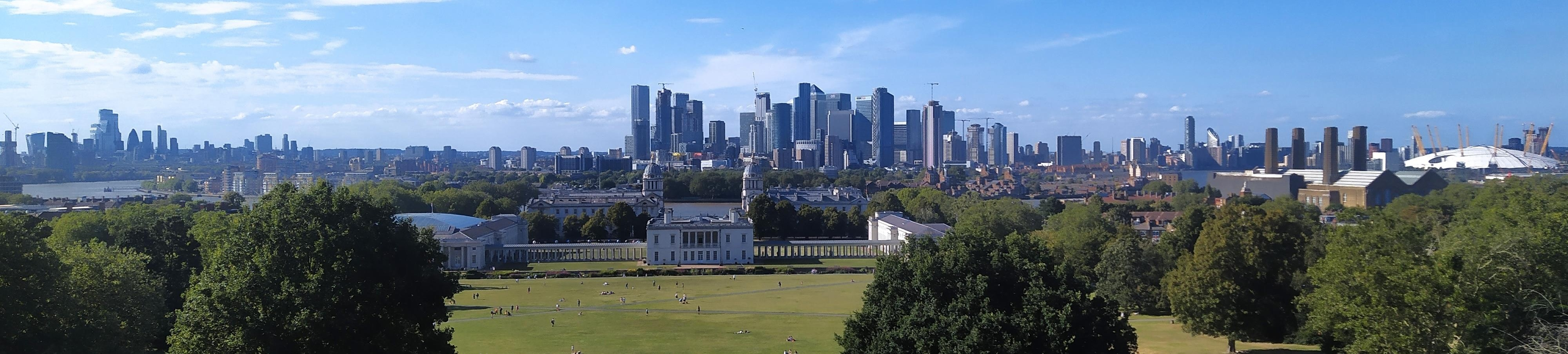
The northwards view from Greenwich Park (in 2023), with the Queen's House and the wings of the National Maritime Museum in the foreground. In the background, skyscrapers from the City of London (left), Canary Wharf (centre), and the Millennium Dome (right).

=== Nearby areas ===
Across the River Thames to the north lies the Isle of Dogs, a riverside district that includes Millwall, a largely residential area, and Canary Wharf, one of London's principal financial and business centres. To the west, beyond Deptford Creek, is Deptford, an area known for its maritime history, cultural diversity, and creative industries. To the east is Charlton, a predominantly residential district with historic landmarks and extensive green spaces. The Greenwich Peninsula lies to the north-east and is a major regeneration area, home to large-scale residential developments, entertainment venues, and the O2. To the south are Blackheath, an affluent village characterised by its large open heath, and Lewisham, a significant town centre and transport hub within south-east London undergoing redevelopment. To the south-west is St John's, a mainly residential neighbourhood with Victorian housing, while to the south-east lies Kidbrooke, an area with new housing and improved infrastructure.

=== Climate ===
This data was collected between 2005 and 2015 at the weather station in Greenwich:

Historically, the record high is 100 °F (38 °C) on 9 August 1911. This was the record for London until 2003, though it was disregarded due to non-standard instruments.

Greenwich has an oceanic climate (Köppen: Cfb) with warm summers and cool winters.

Climate data for Greenwich Park, elevation: 47 m (154 ft), 1991–2020 normals, extremes 1948–2004
Month	Jan	Feb	Mar	Apr	May	Jun	Jul	Aug	Sep	Oct	Nov	Dec	Year
Record high °C (°F)	16.8 (62.2)	19.7 (67.5)	23.3 (73.9)	25.3 (77.5)	29.0 (84.2)	34.5 (94.1)	35.3 (95.5)	37.5 (99.5)	30.2 (86.4)	26.1 (79.0)	18.9 (66.0)	16.4 (61.5)	37.5 (99.5)
Mean daily maximum °C (°F)	8.5 (47.3)	9.2 (48.6)	12.1 (53.8)	15.4 (59.7)	18.6 (65.5)	21.4 (70.5)	23.8 (74.8)	23.3 (73.9)	20.3 (68.5)	15.8 (60.4)	11.6 (52.9)	8.9 (48.0)	15.8 (60.4)
Daily mean °C (°F)	5.9 (42.6)	6.2 (43.2)	8.4 (47.1)	10.7 (51.3)	13.8 (56.8)	16.7 (62.1)	18.8 (65.8)	18.7 (65.7)	15.9 (60.6)	12.4 (54.3)	8.8 (47.8)	6.3 (43.3)	11.9 (53.4)
Mean daily minimum °C (°F)	3.4 (38.1)	3.2 (37.8)	4.7 (40.5)	6.0 (42.8)	9.1 (48.4)	12.0 (53.6)	13.9 (57.0)	14.1 (57.4)	11.6 (52.9)	9.0 (48.2)	6.1 (43.0)	3.8 (38.8)	8.1 (46.6)
Record low °C (°F)	−12.7 (9.1)	−9.4 (15.1)	−6.7 (19.9)	−4.8 (23.4)	−1.0 (30.2)	1.1 (34.0)	5.0 (41.0)	5.3 (41.5)	1.1 (34.0)	−2.1 (28.2)	−8.0 (17.6)	−10.5 (13.1)	−12.7 (9.1)
Average precipitation mm (inches)	43.9 (1.73)	39.9 (1.57)	36.5 (1.44)	38.6 (1.52)	44.0 (1.73)	49.3 (1.94)	36.3 (1.43)	53.0 (2.09)	52.4 (2.06)	58.3 (2.30)	59.9 (2.36)	50.7 (2.00)	562.9 (22.16)
Average precipitation days (≥ 1.0 mm)	10.5	9.2	7.9	8.1	7.9	7.8	7.1	8.2	7.9	10.3	10.6	10.2	105.6
Mean monthly sunshine hours	44.4	66.1	109.7	152.9	198.7	198.6	209.2	198.0	140.6	99.7	58.5	50.1	1,526.4
Source 1: Met Office
Source 2: Starlings Roost Weather

== Sites of interest ==
=== Riverfront ===
RFA Argus being towed to Greenwich in June 2017.

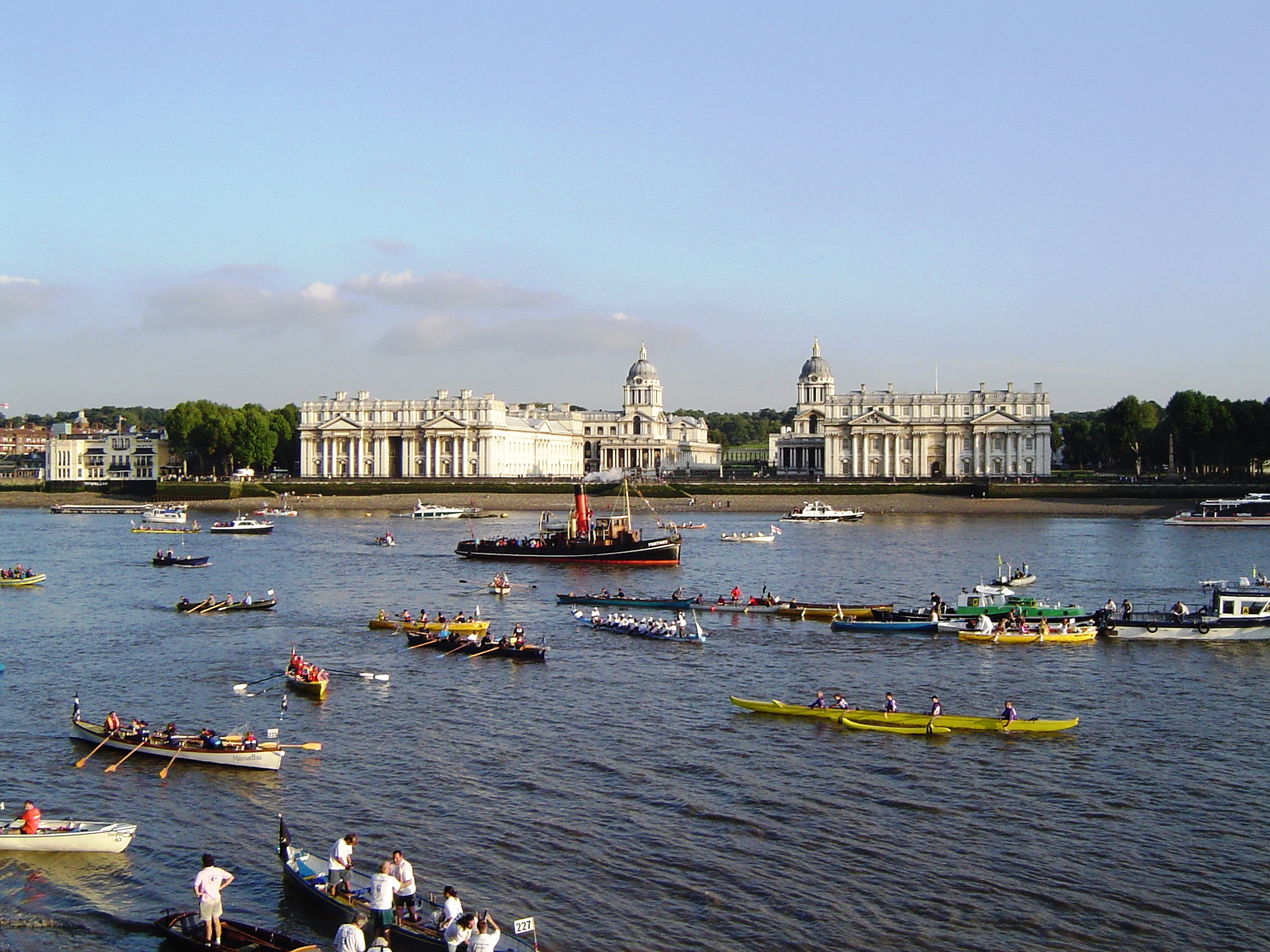
Boats at Greenwich at the end of the Great River Race

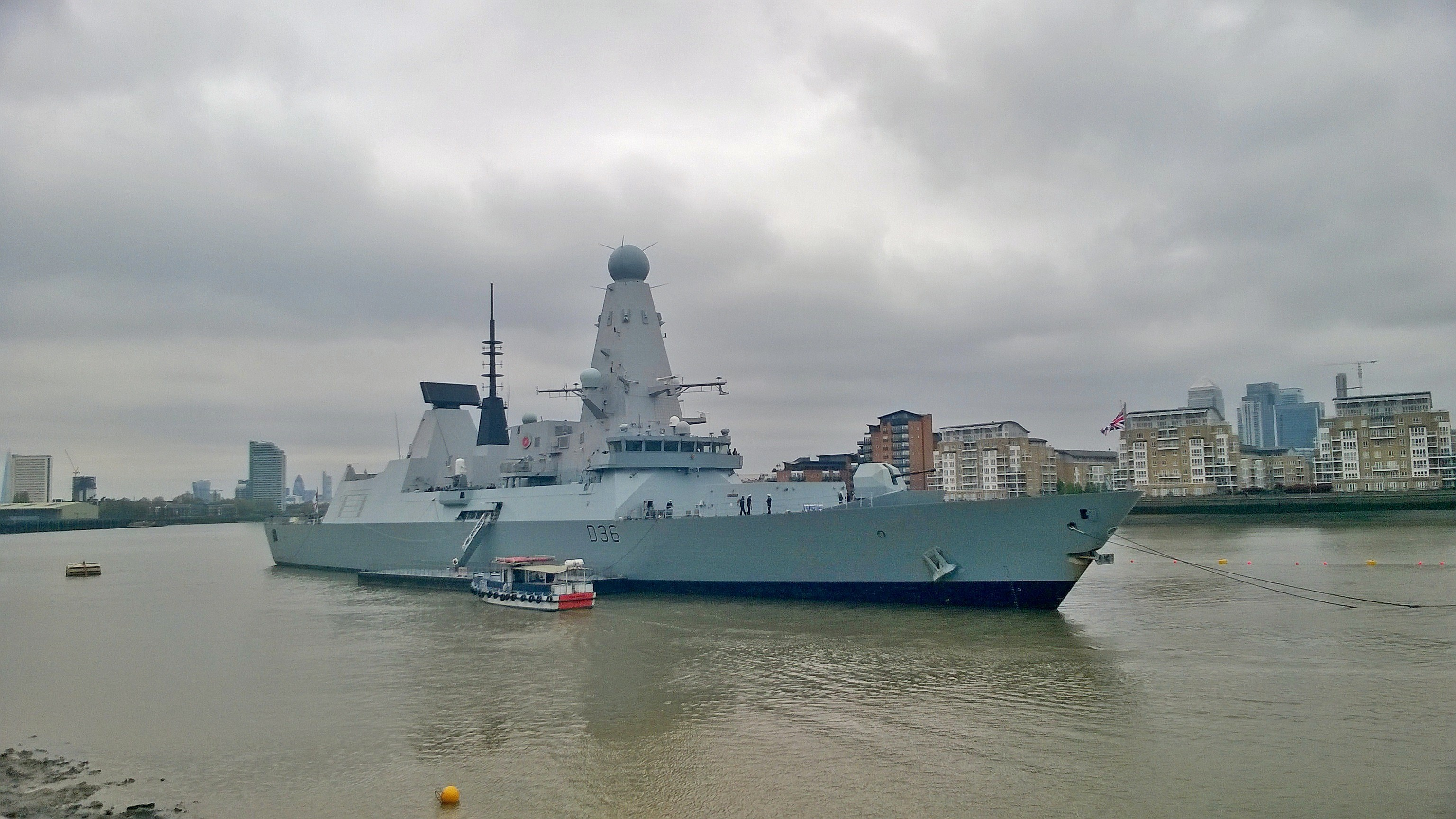
The Royal Navy Type 45 destroyer HMS Defender moored on the riverfront at Greenwich in 2015.

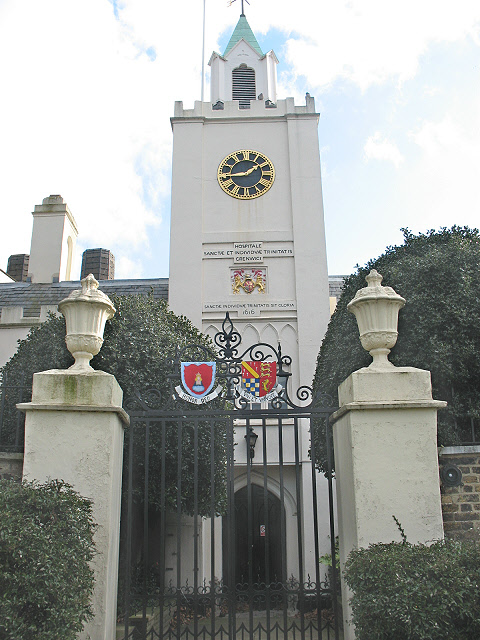
The Trinity Hospital.

The Cutty Sark (a clipper ship) has been preserved in a dry dock by the river. A major fire in May 2007 destroyed a part of the ship, although much had already been removed for restoration. Nearby for many years was also displayed Gipsy Moth IV, the 54 feet (16.5 m) yacht sailed by Sir Francis Chichester in his single-handed, 226-day circumnavigation of the globe during 1966–67. In 2004, Gipsy Moth IV was removed from Greenwich, and after restoration work completed a second circumnavigation in May 2007. On the riverside in front of the north-west corner of the hospital is an obelisk erected in memory of Arctic explorer Joseph René Bellot.

Near the Cutty Sark site, a cylindrical building contains the entrance to the Greenwich foot tunnel, opened on 4 August 1902. This connects Greenwich to the Isle of Dogs on the northern side of the River Thames. The north exit of the tunnel is at Island Gardens, from where the famous view of Greenwich Hospital painted by Canaletto can be seen.

Rowing has been part of life on the river at Greenwich for hundreds of years and the first Greenwich Regatta was held in 1785. The annual Great River Race along the Thames Tideway finishes at the Cutty Sark. The nearby Trafalgar Rowing Centre in Crane Street is home to Curlew and Globe rowing clubs.

The Old Royal Naval College is Sir Christopher Wren's domed masterpiece at the centre of the heritage site. The site is administered by the Greenwich Foundation and several of the buildings are let to the University of Greenwich and one, the King Charles block, to Trinity College of Music. Within the complex is the former college dining room, the Painted Hall, this was painted by James Thornhill, and the Chapel of St Peter and St Paul, with an interior designed by James 'Athenian' Stuart. The Naval College had a training reactor, the JASON reactor, within the King William building that was operational between 1962 and 1996. The reactor was decommissioned and removed in 1999.

To the east of the Naval College is the Trinity Hospital almshouse, founded in 1613, the oldest surviving building in the town centre. This is next to the massive brick walls and the landing stage of Greenwich Power Station. Built between 1902 and 1910 as a coal-fired station to supply power to London's tram system, and later the London Underground, it is now oil- and gas-powered and serves as a backup station for London Underground. East Greenwich also has a small park, East Greenwich Pleasaunce, which was formerly the burial ground of Greenwich Hospital.

The O_{2} (formerly the Millennium Dome) was built on part of the site of East Greenwich Gas Works, a disused British Gas site on the Greenwich Peninsula. It is next to North Greenwich Underground station, about 3 miles (4.8 km) north east from the Greenwich town centre, north west of Charlton. Pear Tree Wharf was associated with the gas works, being used to unload coal for the manufacturing of town gas, and is now home to the Greenwich Yacht Club. The Greenwich Millennium Village is a modern urban regeneration development to the south of the Dome. Enderby's Wharf is a site associated with submarine cable manufacture for over 150 years.

=== Greenwich Park ===
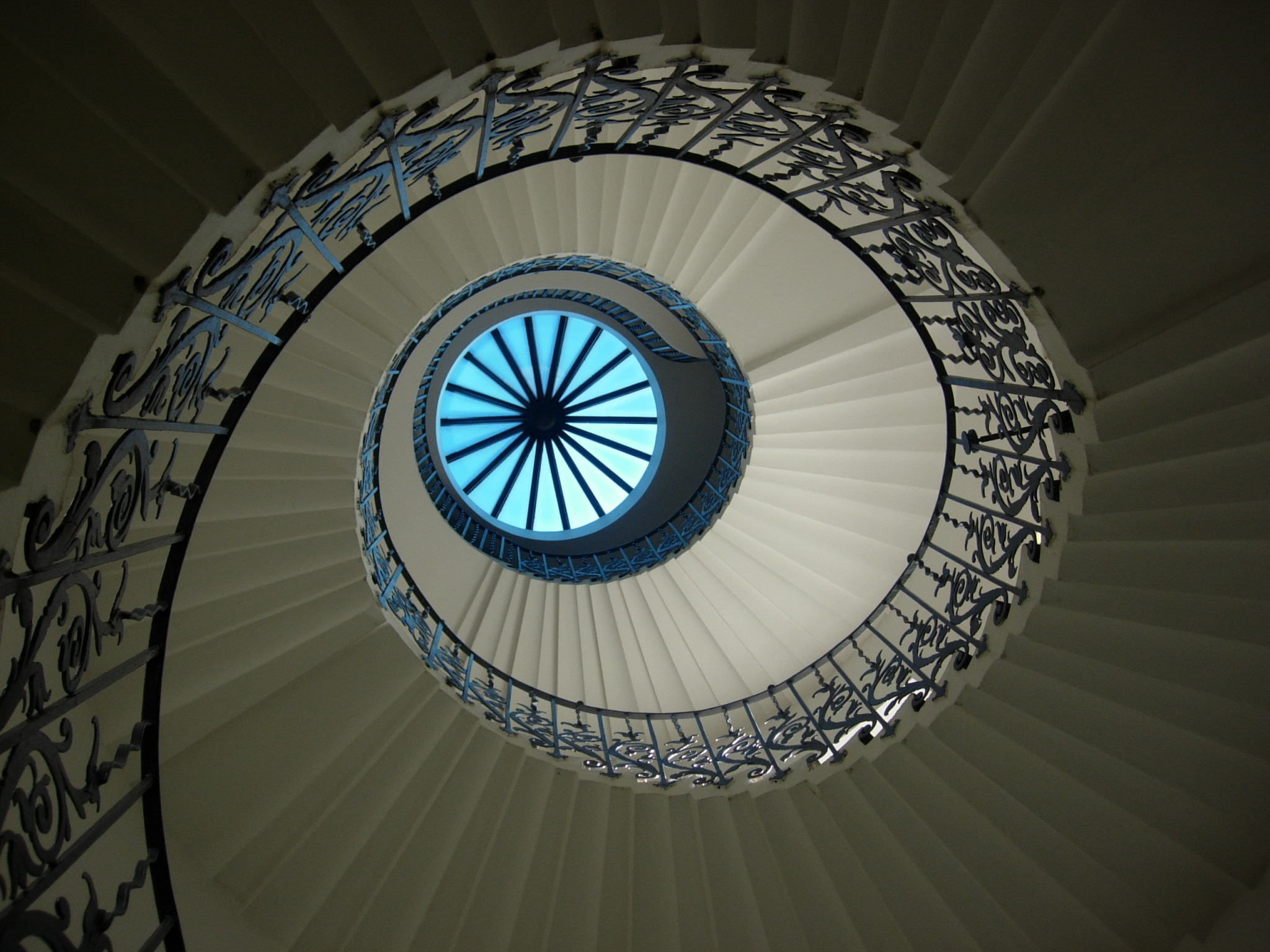
Spiral staircase and lantern at the Queen's House.

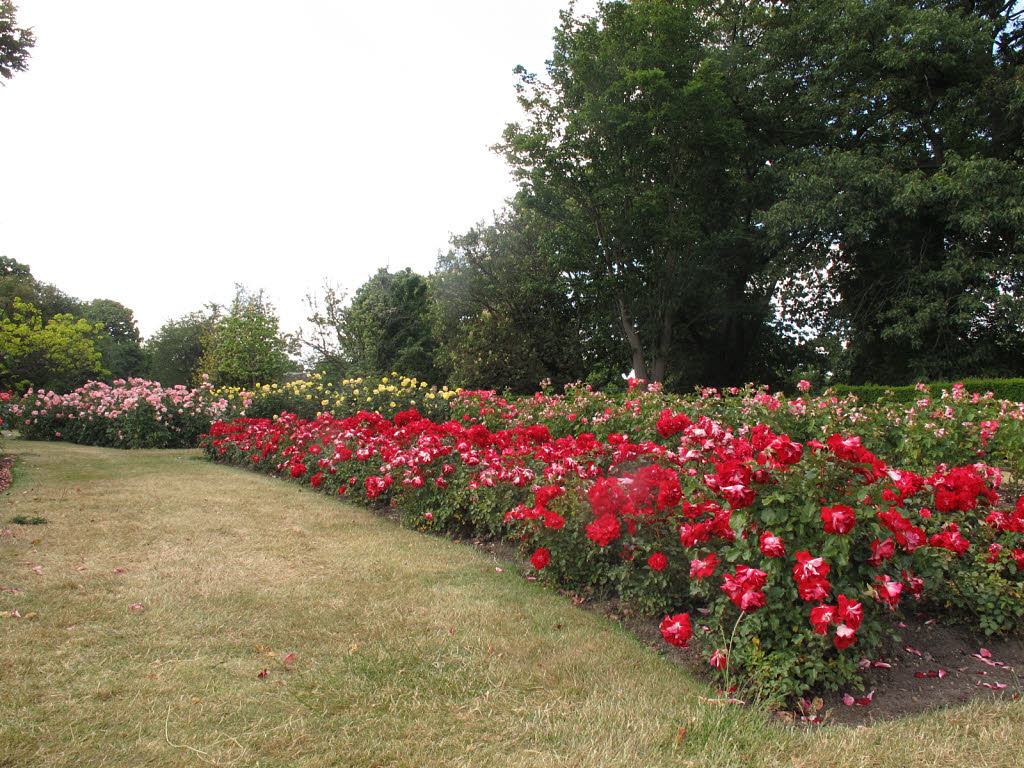
Rose garden in Greenwich Park.

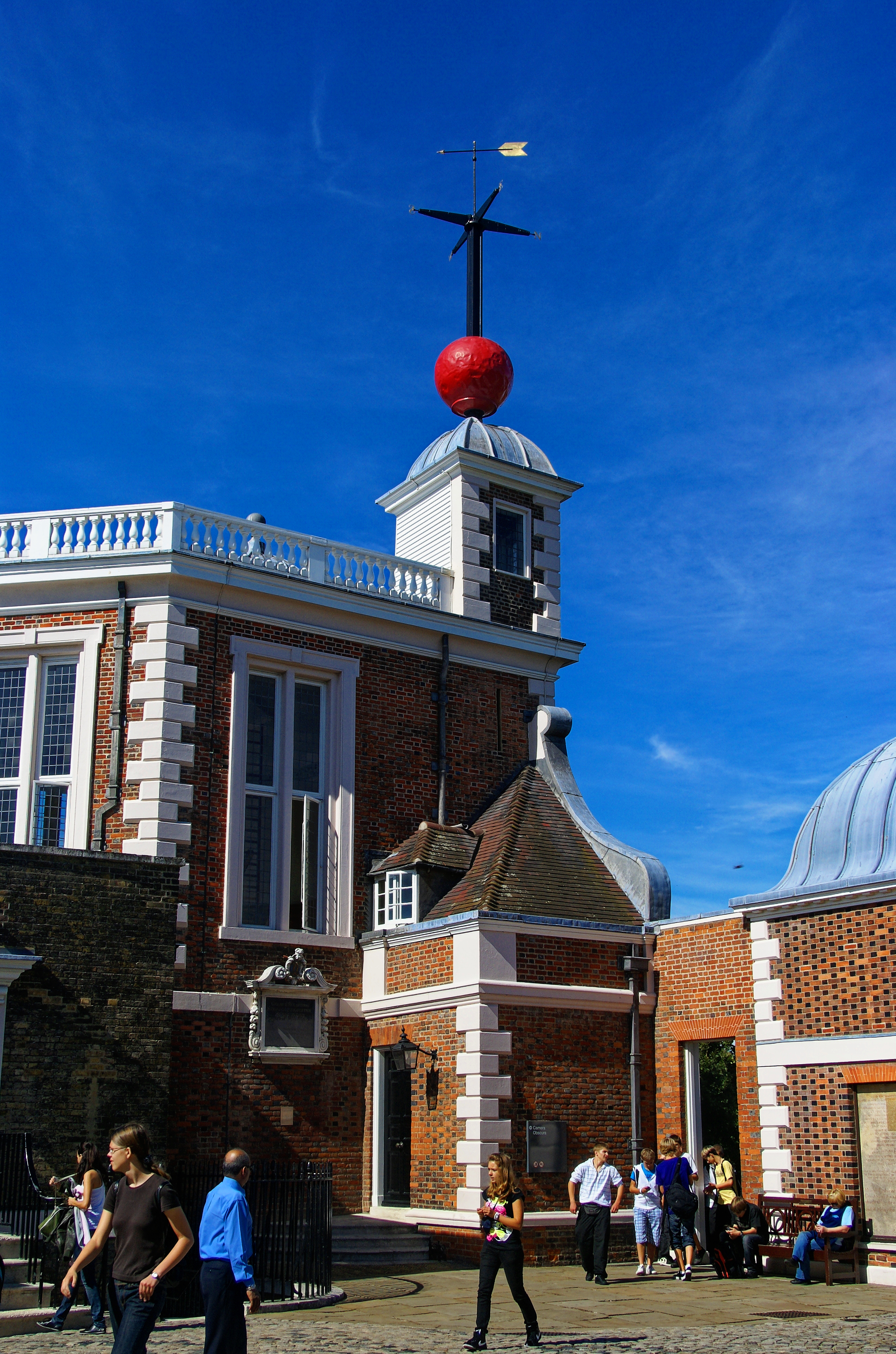
The Royal Observatory.

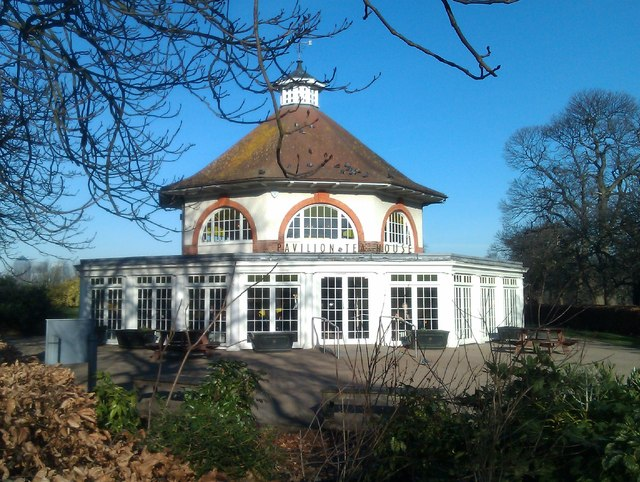
The Pavilion Tea House in the park.

South of the former Naval College is the National Maritime Museum housed in buildings forming another symmetrical group and grand arcade incorporating the Queen's House, designed by Inigo Jones. Continuing to the south, Greenwich Park is a Royal Park of 183 acres (0.7 km^{2}), laid out in the 17th century and formed from the hunting grounds of the Royal Palace of Placentia.

The park rises towards Blackheath and at the top of this hill is a statue of James Wolfe, commander of the British expedition to capture Quebec. Nearby a major group of buildings within the park includes the former Royal Observatory, Greenwich; the Prime Meridian passes through this building.

The Ranger's House lies at the Blackheath end of the park and houses the Wernher Collection of art, and many fine houses, including Vanbrugh's house lie on Maze Hill, on the western edge of the park.

==== Greenwich Mean Time ====
Greenwich Mean Time was at one time based on the time observations made at the Royal Greenwich Observatory, before being superseded by the closely related Coordinated Universal Time (UTC). While there is no longer a working astronomical observatory at Greenwich, a ball still drops daily to mark the exact moment of 1 p.m., and there is a museum of astronomical and navigational tools, particularly John Harrison's marine chronometers.

Greenwich Mean Time (GMT) is a term originally referring to mean solar time at the Royal Observatory, Greenwich, which overlooks the River Thames from a hill in Greenwich Park. GMT is commonly used in practice to refer to Coordinated Universal Time (UTC) when this is viewed as a time zone, especially by bodies connected with the United Kingdom, such as the BBC World Service, the Royal Navy, the Met Office and others, although strictly UTC is an atomic time scale which only approximates GMT with a tolerance of 0.9 second. It is also used to refer to Universal Time (UT), which is a standard astronomical concept used in many technical fields and is often referred to by the military in the phrase Zulu time.

As the United Kingdom grew into an advanced maritime nation, British mariners kept at least one chronometer on GMT in order to calculate their longitude from the Greenwich meridian, which was by convention considered to have longitude zero degrees (this convention was internationally adopted in the International Meridian Conference of 1884). (Note: Voting took place on 13 October and the resolutions were adopted on 22 October 1884.) The synchronization of the chronometer on GMT did not affect shipboard time itself, which was still solar time. But this practice, combined with mariners from other nations drawing from Nevil Maskelyne's method of lunar distances based on observations at Greenwich, eventually led to GMT being used worldwide as a reference time independent of location. Most time zones were based upon this reference as a number of hours and half-hours "ahead of GMT" or "behind GMT".

In recognition of the suburb's astronomical links, Asteroid 2830 has been named 'Greenwich'.

=== Town centre and market ===
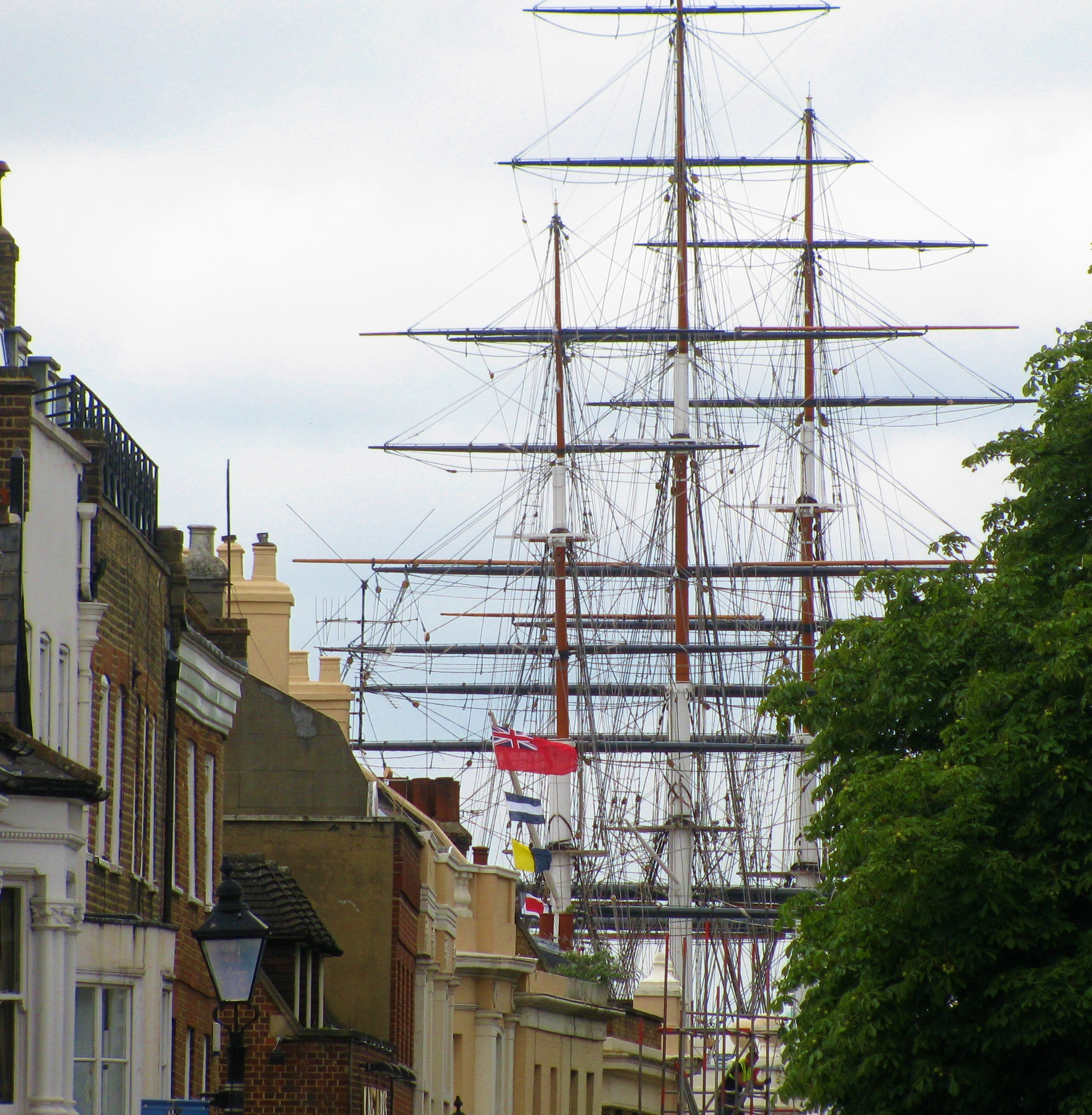
Cutty Sark

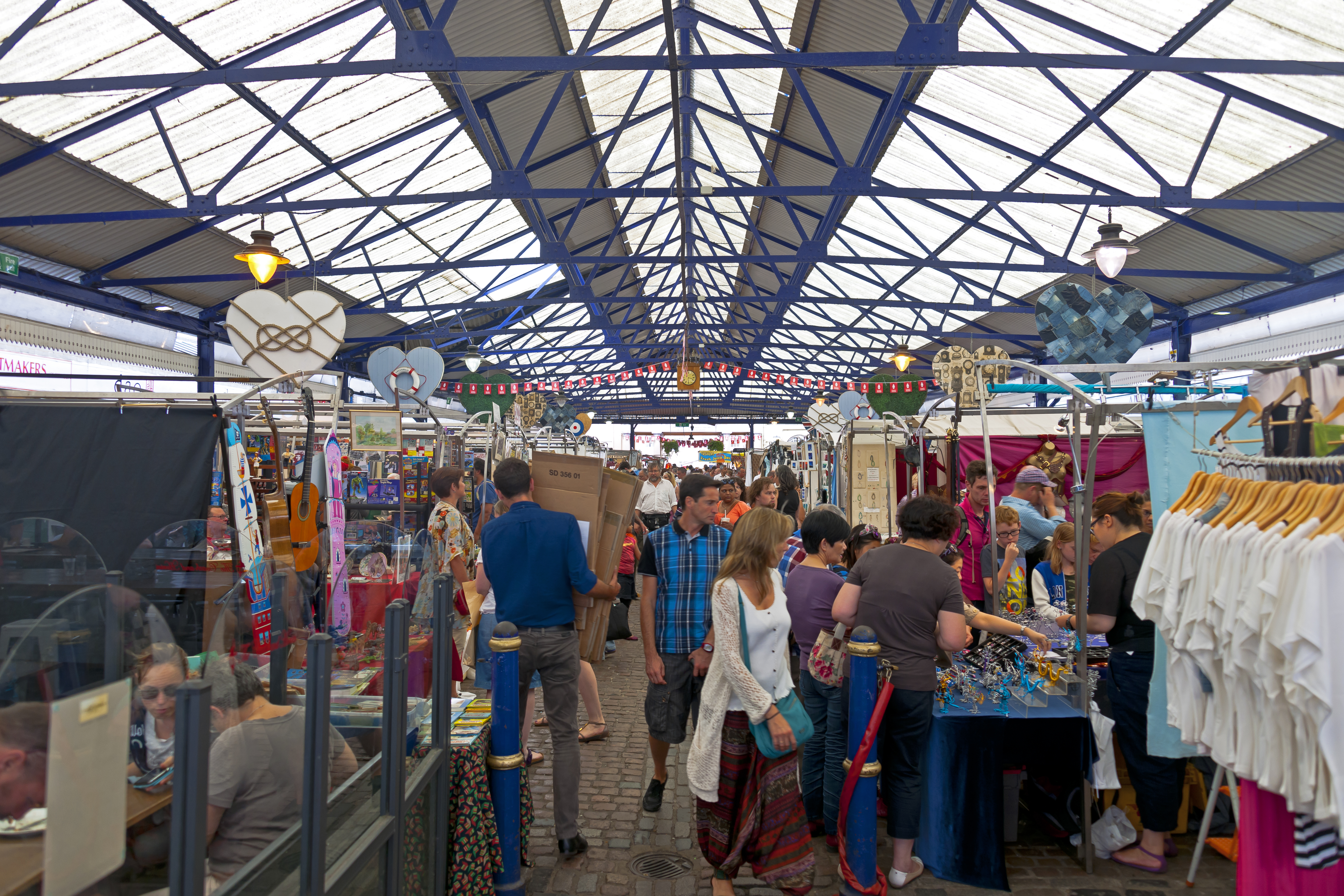
Greenwich Market

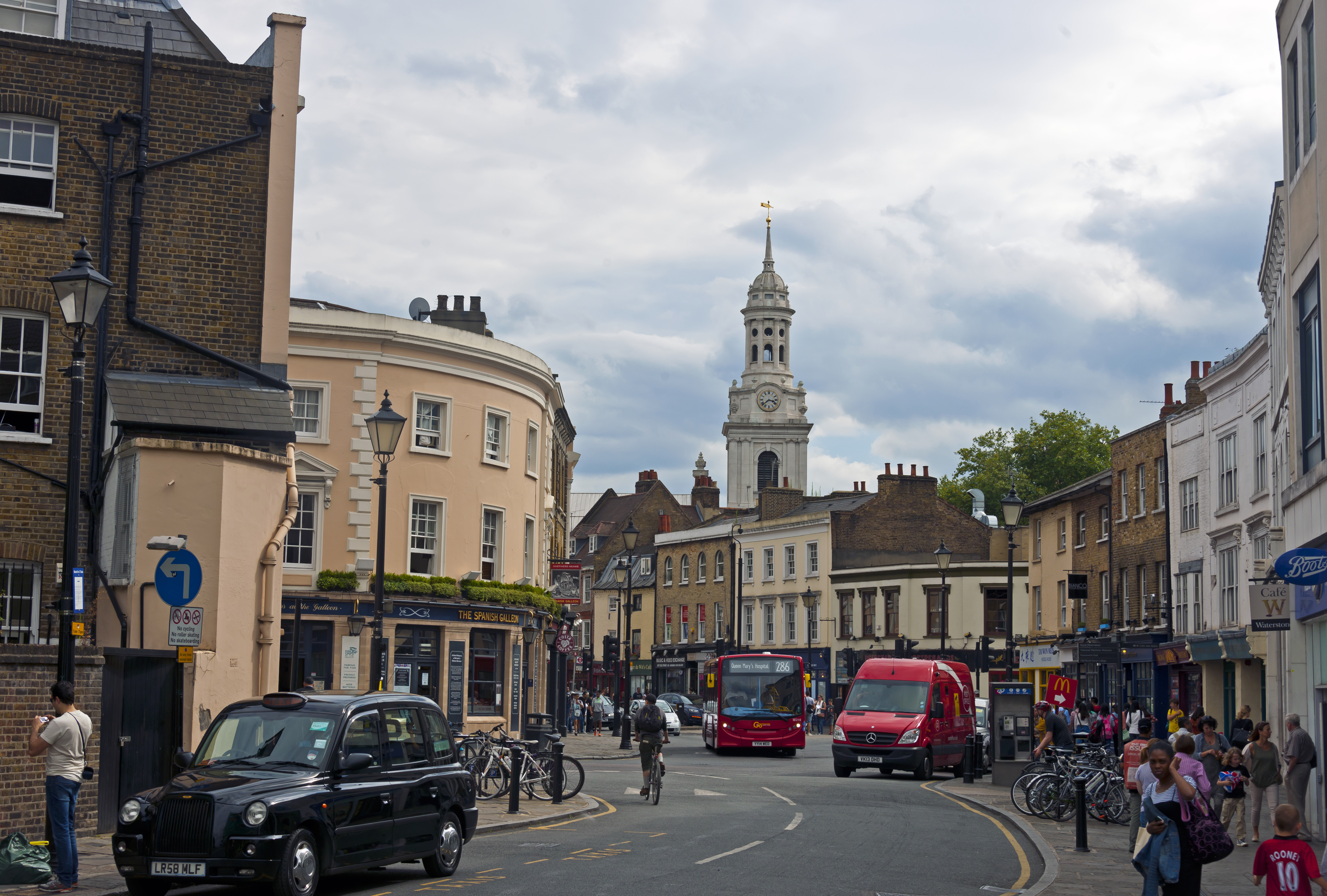
Town centre on Greenwich Church Street

Around the covered Greenwich Market, Georgian and Victorian architecture dominates in the town centre which spreads to the west of the park and Royal Naval College. Up the hill from the centre, there are many streets of Georgian houses, including the Fan Museum, on Croom's Hill. Nearby, at the junction of Croom's Hill with Nevada Street, is Greenwich Theatre; at the eastern end of Nevada Street is the Greenwich Tavern. To the west, the arthouse Greenwich Cinema is on Greenwich High Road, while the nearby Greenwich Playhouse closed in 2012.

There has been a market at Greenwich since the 14th century, but the history of the present market dates from 1700 when a charter to run two markets, on Wednesdays and Saturdays, was assigned by Lord Romney (Henry, Earl of Romney) to the Commissioners of Greenwich Hospital for 1000 years.

The market is part of "the island site", bounded by College Approach, Greenwich Church Street, King William Walk and Nelson Road, near the National Maritime Museum and the Royal Observatory. The buildings surrounding the market are Grade II listed and were established in 1827–1833 under the direction of Joseph Kay. A market roof was added in 1902–1908 (and replaced in 2016). Later significant development occurred in 1958–1960 and during the 1980s.

The landowner, Greenwich Hospital, enhanced the market between 2014 and early 2016. Following the COVID-19 pandemic in 2020 the rents for several of the market stalls were increased by up to 60% as Greenwich Hospital's managing agent Knight Frank said it was losing money with fewer stalls operating and only four days of trading a week.

=== Residential ===
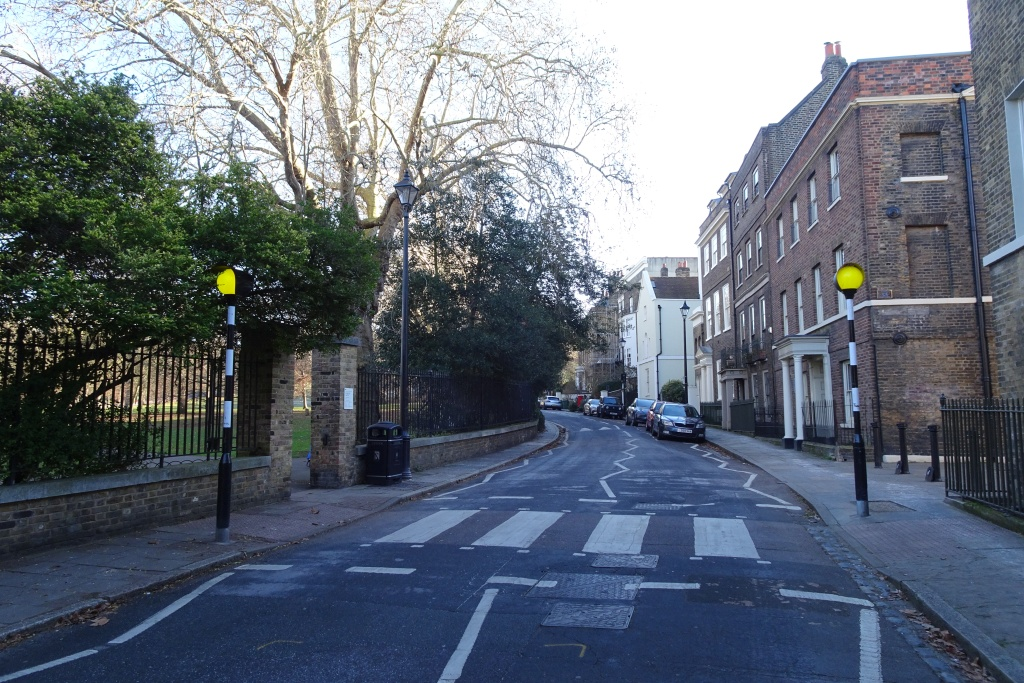
Crooms Hill, the oldest continually named street in London.

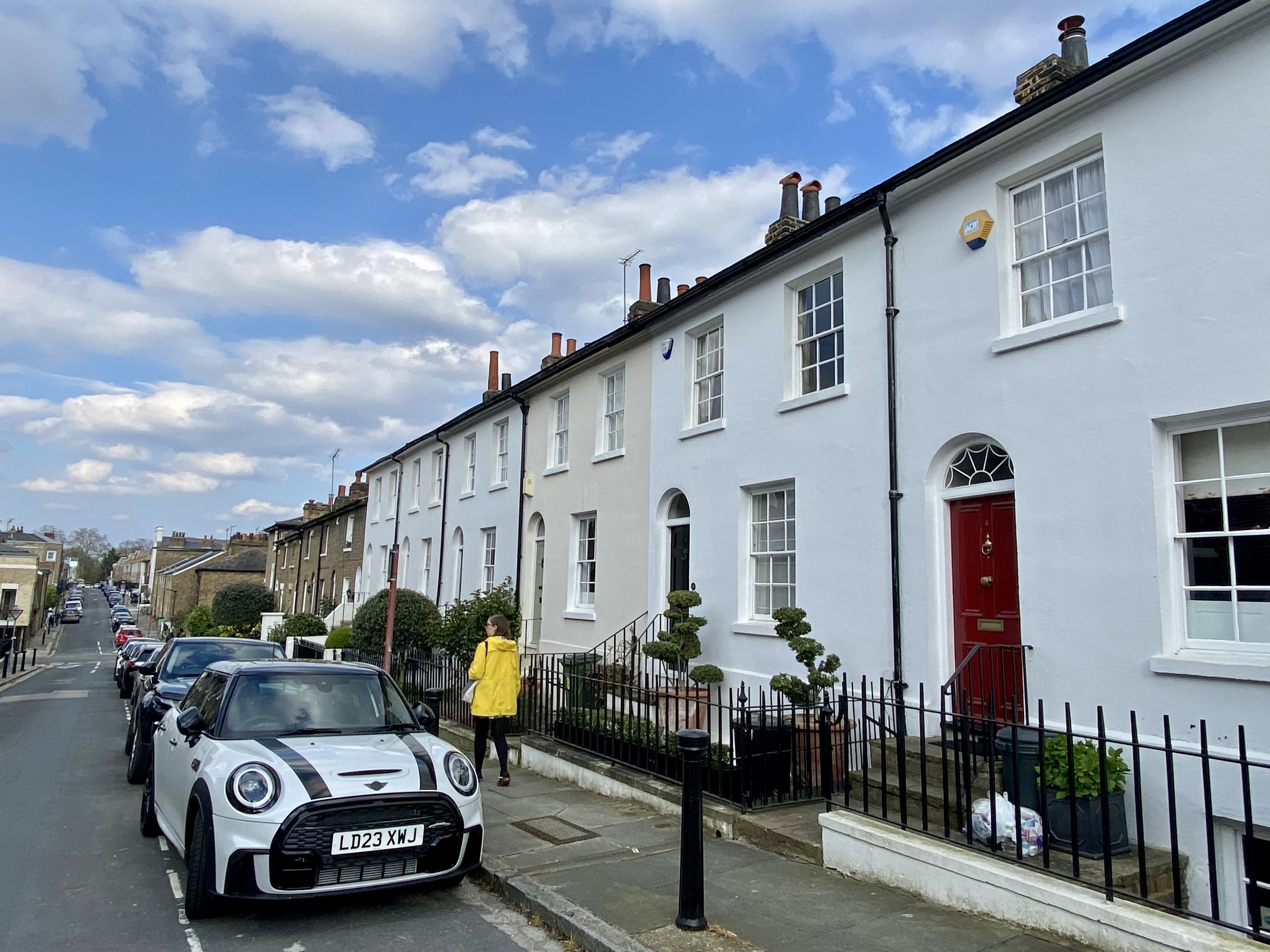
King George Street towards Greenwich Park.

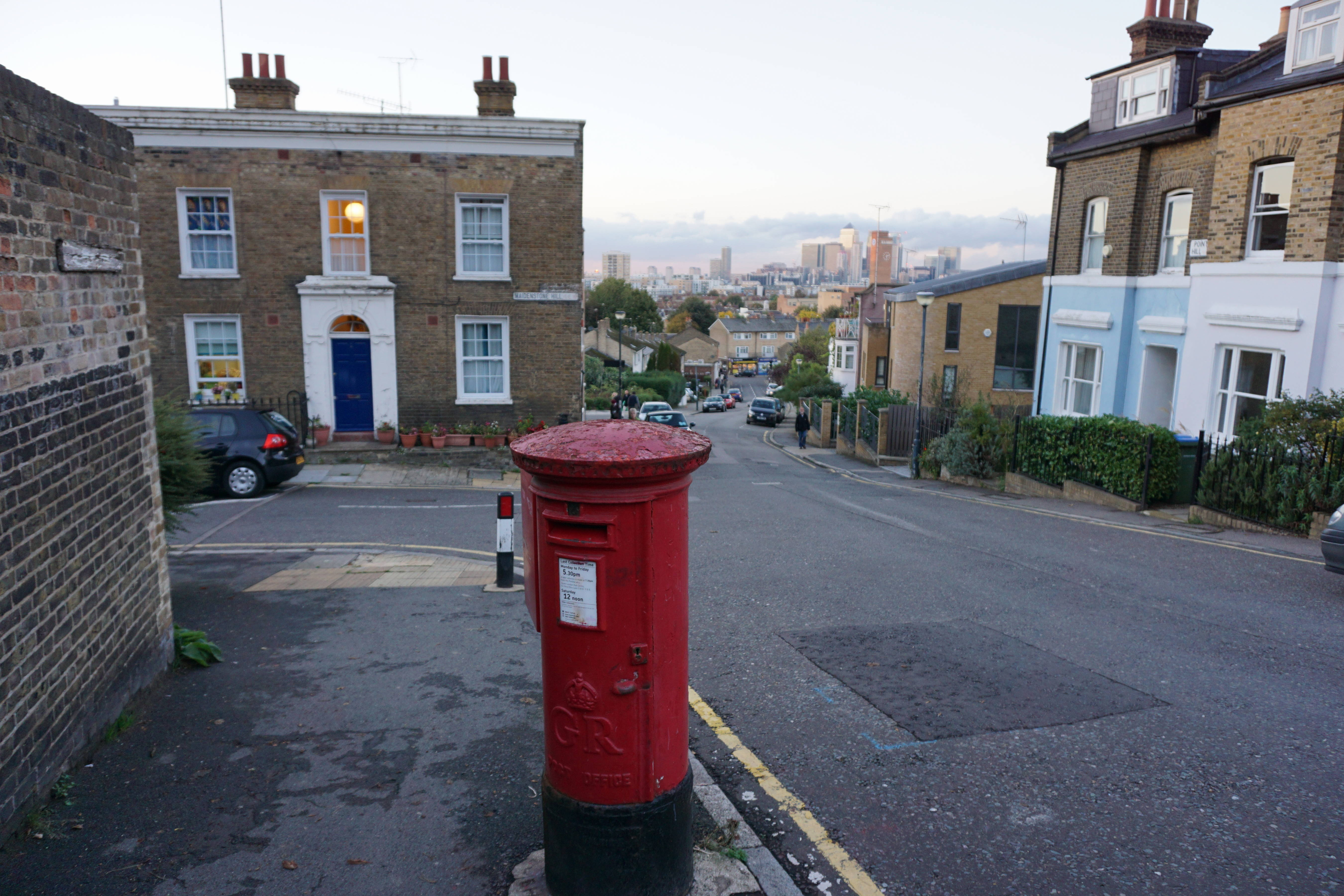
View towards Canary Wharf from the intersection between Maidenstone Hill and Point Hill.

Greenwich's residential character is defined by a remarkably well-preserved stock of Georgian and Victorian housing concentrated in the streets to the west and south of the town centre, much of which falls within the West Greenwich Conservation Area.

Croom's Hill, running along the western boundary of Greenwich Park, has been described by the architectural historian Nikolaus Pevsner as "the pride of domestic architecture in Greenwich". The street contains houses built piecemeal from the 17th century onwards, many of them Grade II listed, and was developed following the enclosure of Greenwich Park in 1619. Near its northern end, the terraced townhouses give way to larger individual houses further south towards Blackheath.

To the west of Croom's Hill lies Gloucester Circus, one of Greenwich's most distinguished residential set-pieces. Designed in 1790 by local architect Michael Searles as a speculative development intended to attract middle-class professionals, the southern crescent of three-storey stock-brick houses was built between 1791 and 1809, and is Grade II listed. Searles's original design envisaged two matching crescents enclosing a communal garden; only the southern crescent was completed, with plainer Victorian houses added to the north around 1840.

Further west, Royal Hill is a largely residential street lined with Georgian and early Victorian housing. The West Greenwich Conservation Area encompasses numerous additional streets of consistent period character, including Hyde Vale, Point Hill, and Maidenstone Hill, the latter notable for its uniform rows of early-to-mid-19th century London stock brick terraces developed by the Morden College and stepped to follow the natural slope of the hill.

=== Discover Greenwich Visitor Centre ===
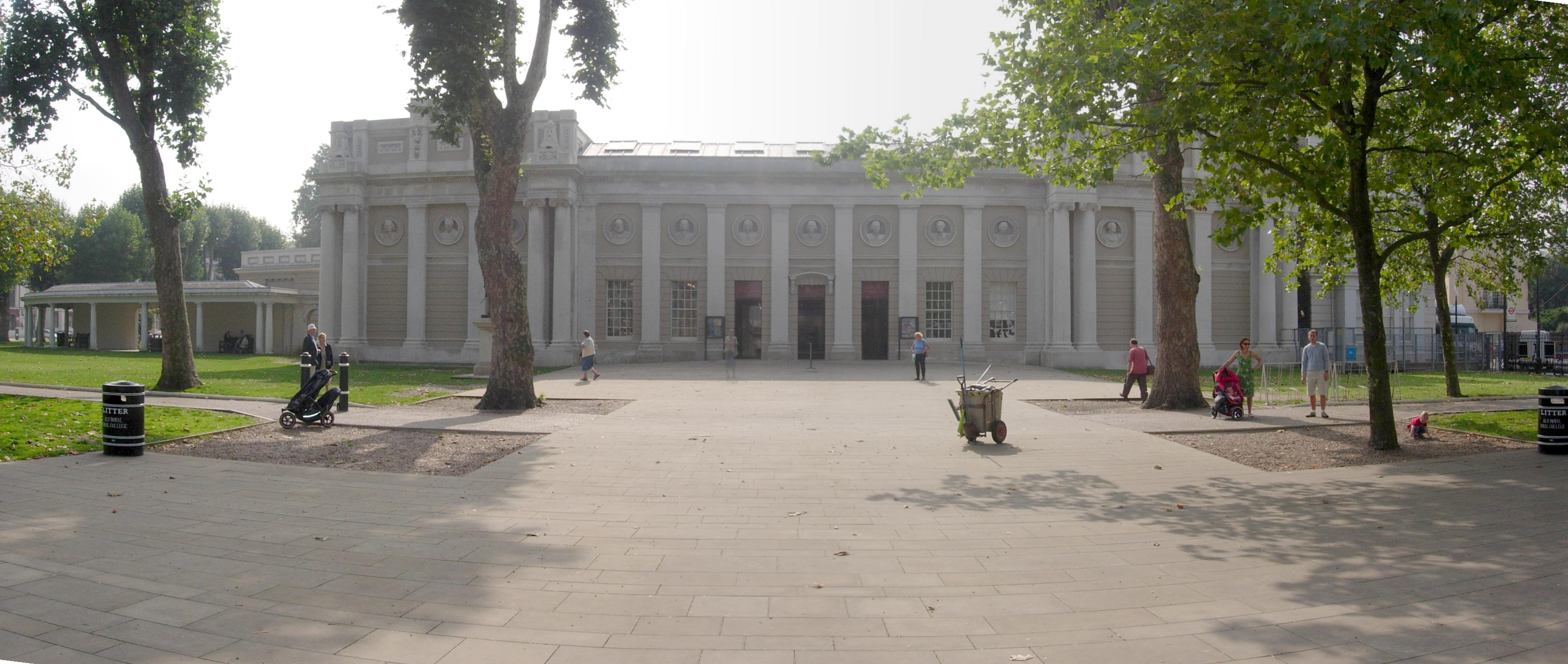
Pepys Building

The Discover Greenwich Visitor Centre provides an introduction to the history and attractions in the Greenwich World Heritage Site. It is in The Pepys Building near to the Cutty Sark within the grounds of the Old Royal Naval College (formerly Greenwich Hospital); the building began life as an engineering laboratory for the college. The centre opened in March 2010, and admission costs £3.

The Centre explains the history of Greenwich as a royal residence and a maritime centre. Exhibits include:

- The history of the Palace of Placentia on the site.
- Models of Christopher Wren's original designs for Greenwich Hospital.
- Six of the carved heads originally intended to decorate the exterior of the college's Painted Hall.
- Exhibition displays about Maritime Greenwich and its connections with the sea and exploration.
- "By Wisdom as much as War" – an exhibition about the history of the Royal Naval College during the years it occupied Greenwich Hospital (1873–1998).

== World Heritage Site ==
In 1997 Maritime Greenwich was added to the list of World Heritage Sites by UNESCO, for the concentration and quality of buildings of historic and architectural interest. These can be divided into the group of buildings along the riverfront, Greenwich Park and the Georgian and Victorian town centre. The World Heritage Site is described as:

The ensemble of buildings at Greenwich, an outlying district of London, and the park in which they are set, symbolize English artistic and scientific endeavour in the 17th and 18th centuries. The Queen's House (by Inigo Jones) was the first Palladian building in England, while the complex that was until recently the Royal Naval College was designed by Christopher Wren. The park, laid out on the basis of an original design by André Le Nôtre, contains the Old Royal Observatory, the work of Wren and the scientist Robert Hooke.

— UNESCO

The area was selected by UNESCO on the criteria (i)(ii)(iv)(vi), recognizing it as a masterpiece of human creative genius, an important expression of intercultural exchange, an outstanding example of a significant stage in human history, and as being directly associated with events, traditions, or ideas of outstanding universal significance.

UNESCO World Heritage Site Maritime Greenwich (Dossier 795)
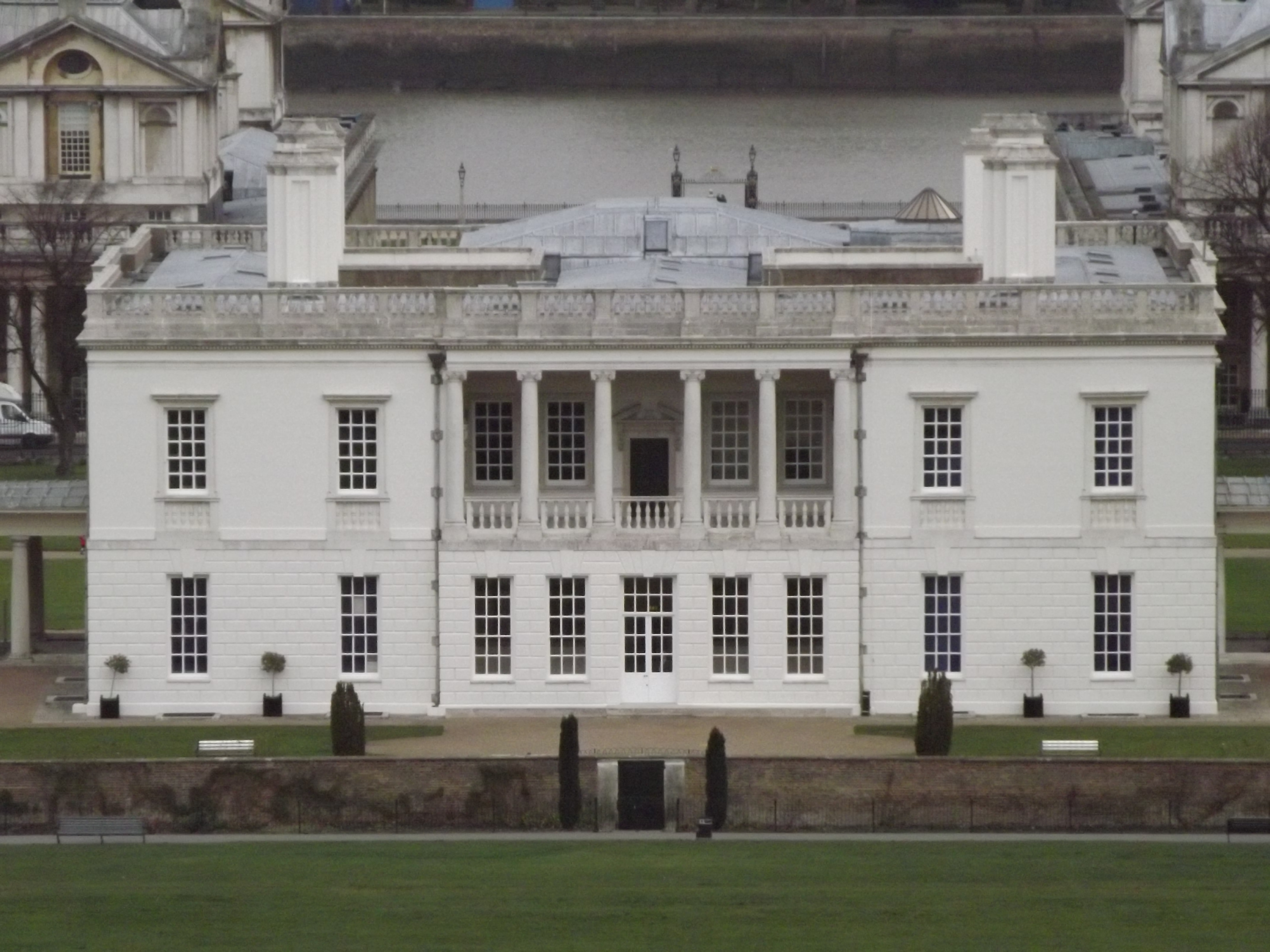
The Queen's House, built between 1616 and 1635, gifted by King Charles I to Henrietta Maria in 1629.

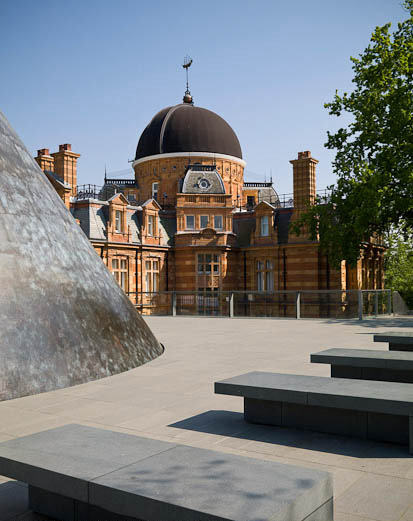
The Royal Observatory, commissioned in 1675 by King Charles II to improve navigation.

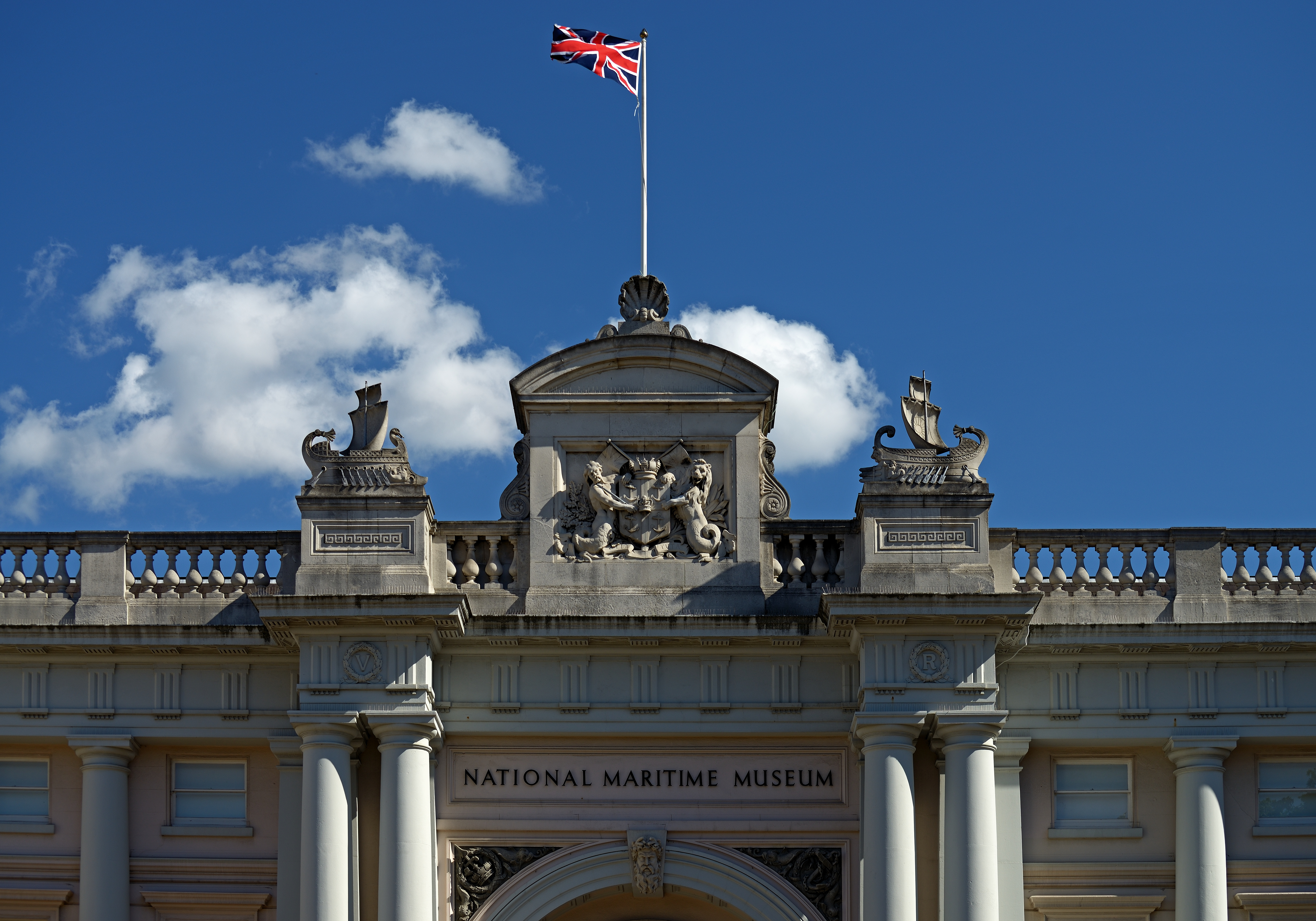
The National Maritime Museum, formally opened in 1937 by King George VI.

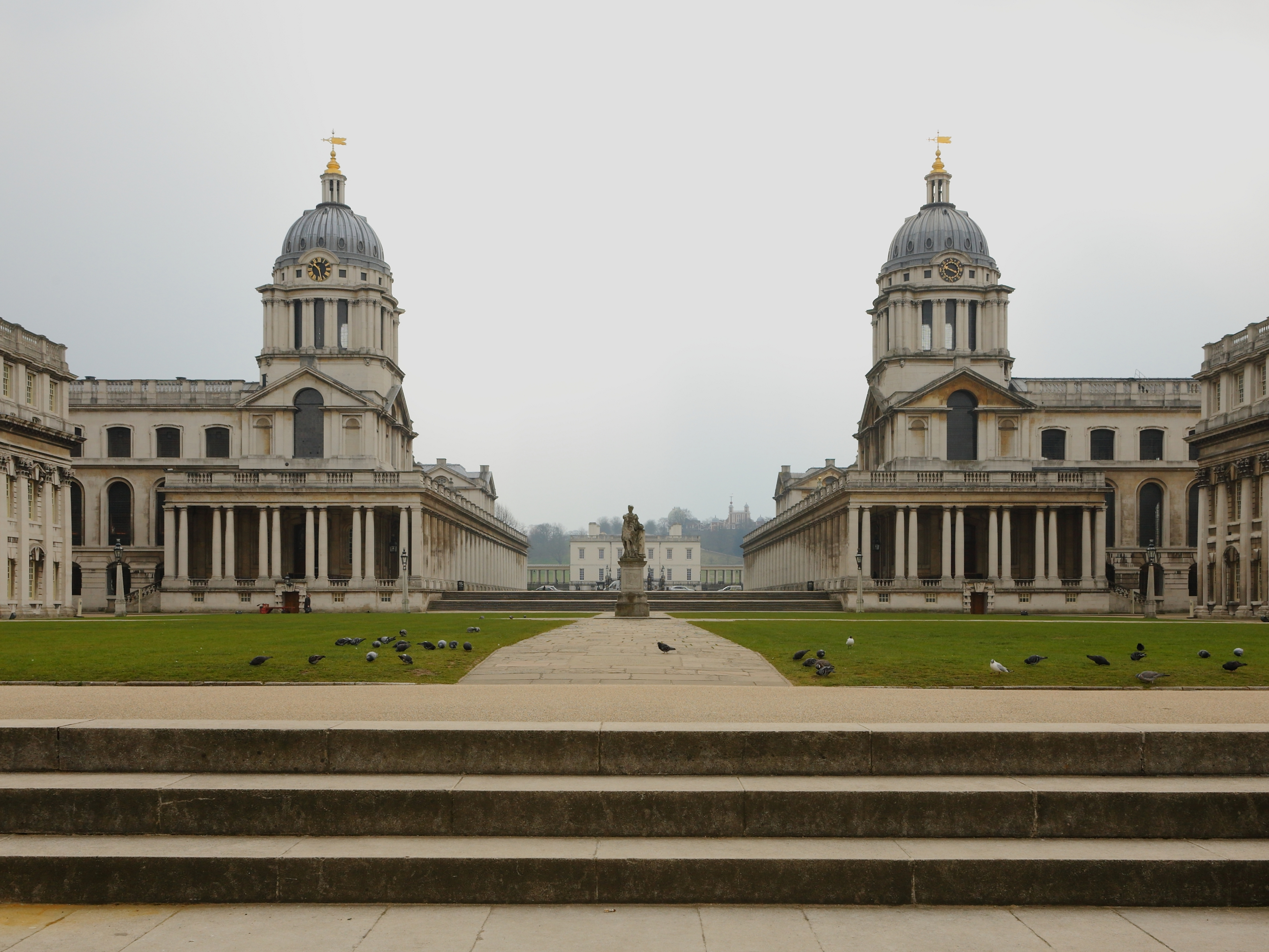
The Royal Naval College, designed by Sir Christopher Wren and built between 1696 and 1712.

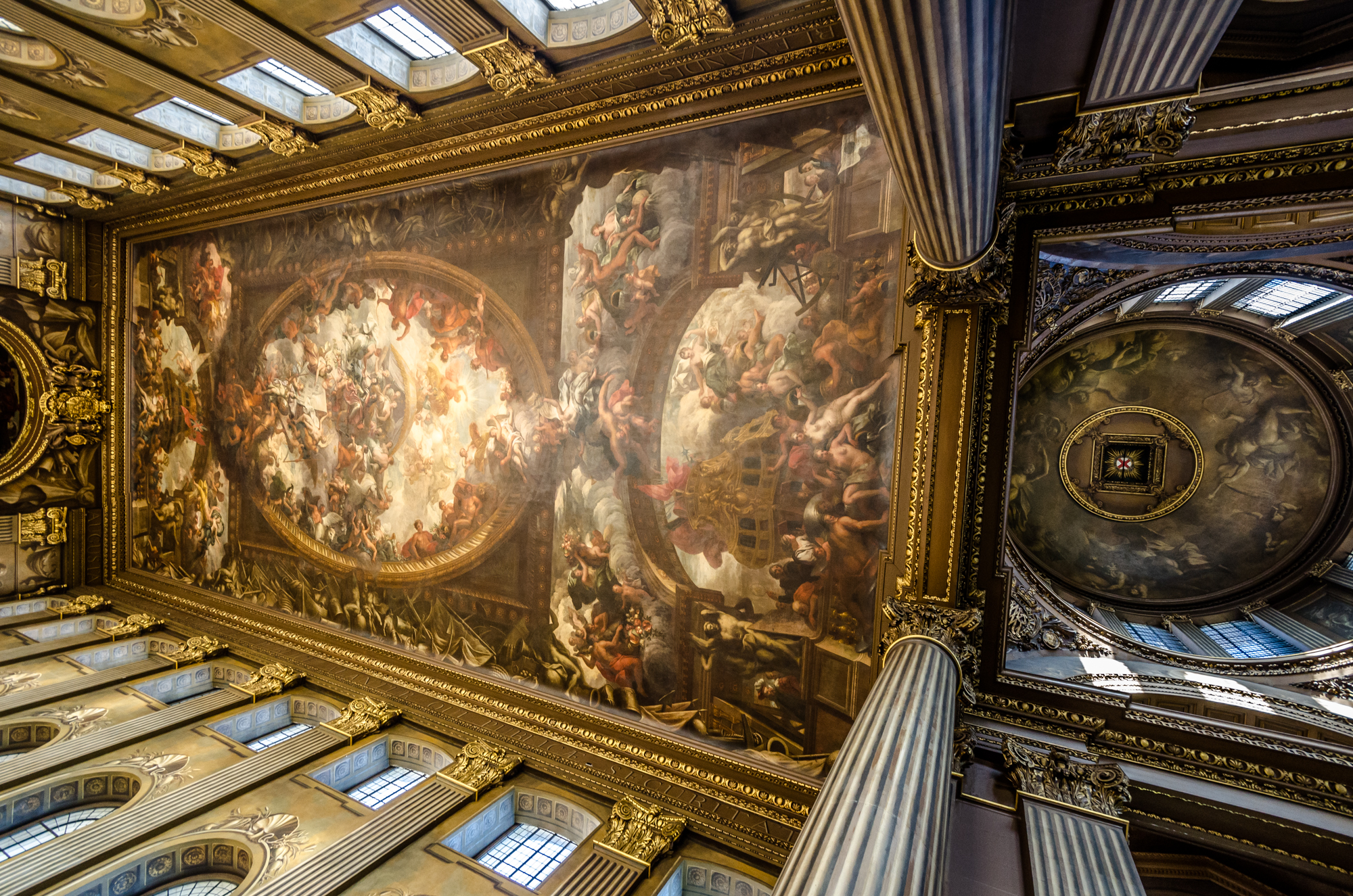
Designed by Sir James Thornhill and painted between 1707 and 1726, the Painted Hall features Baroque walls and ceilings.

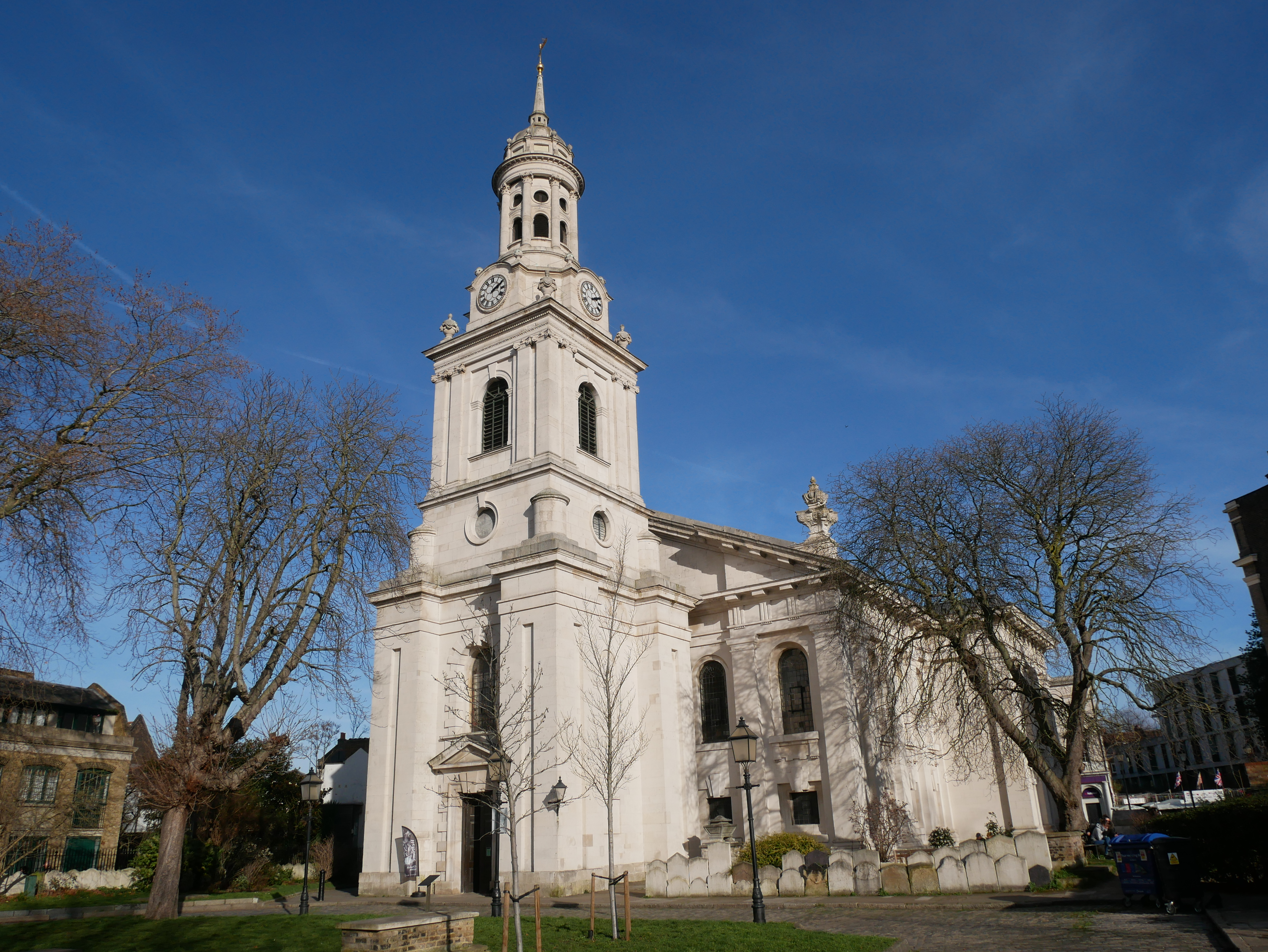
The St Alfege Church, of medieval origin and rebuilt in 1712–1714 to the designs of Nicholas Hawksmoor.

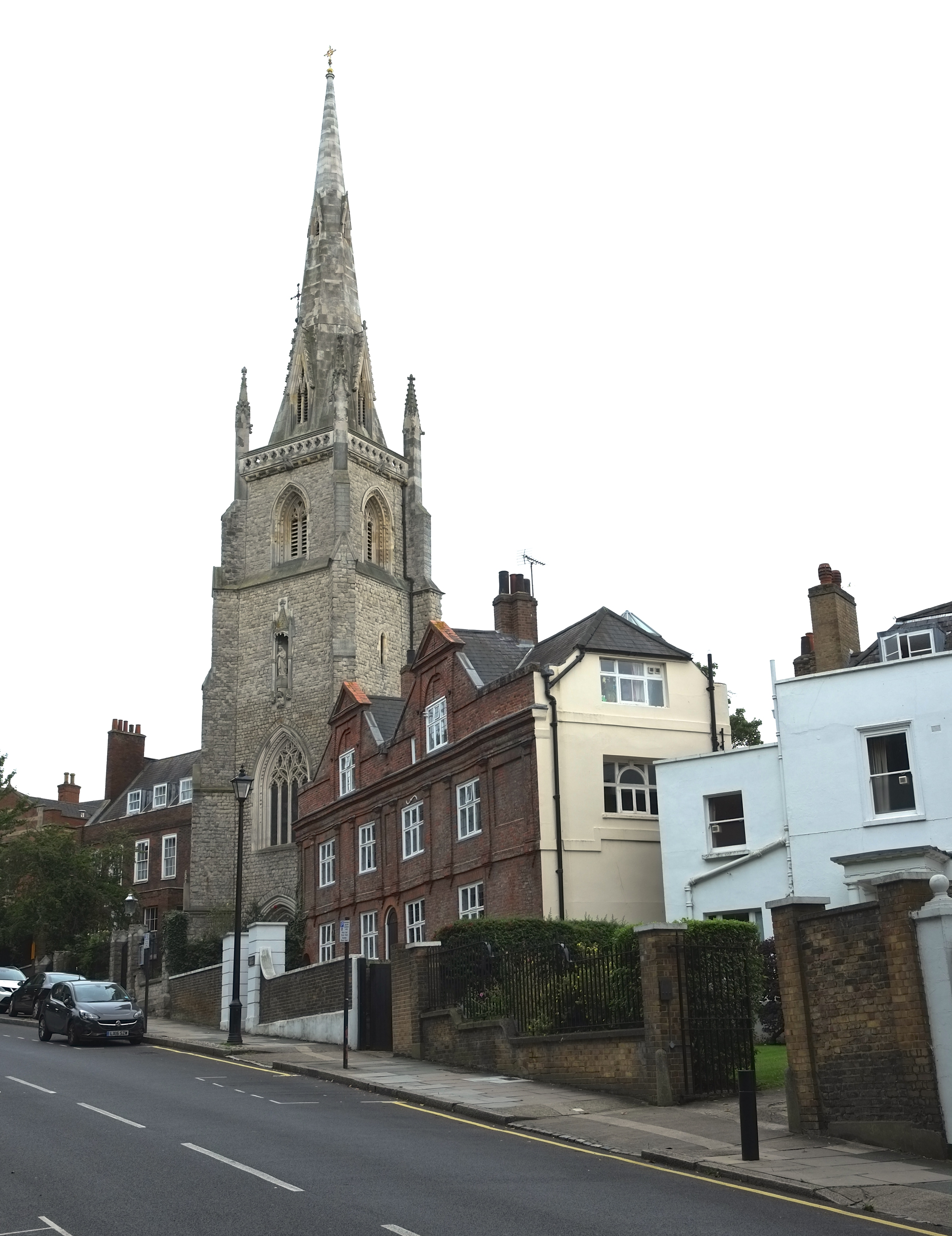
Our Ladye Star of the Sea Church on Croom's Hill that opened in 1851, designed by William Wardell in a Decorated Gothic style.

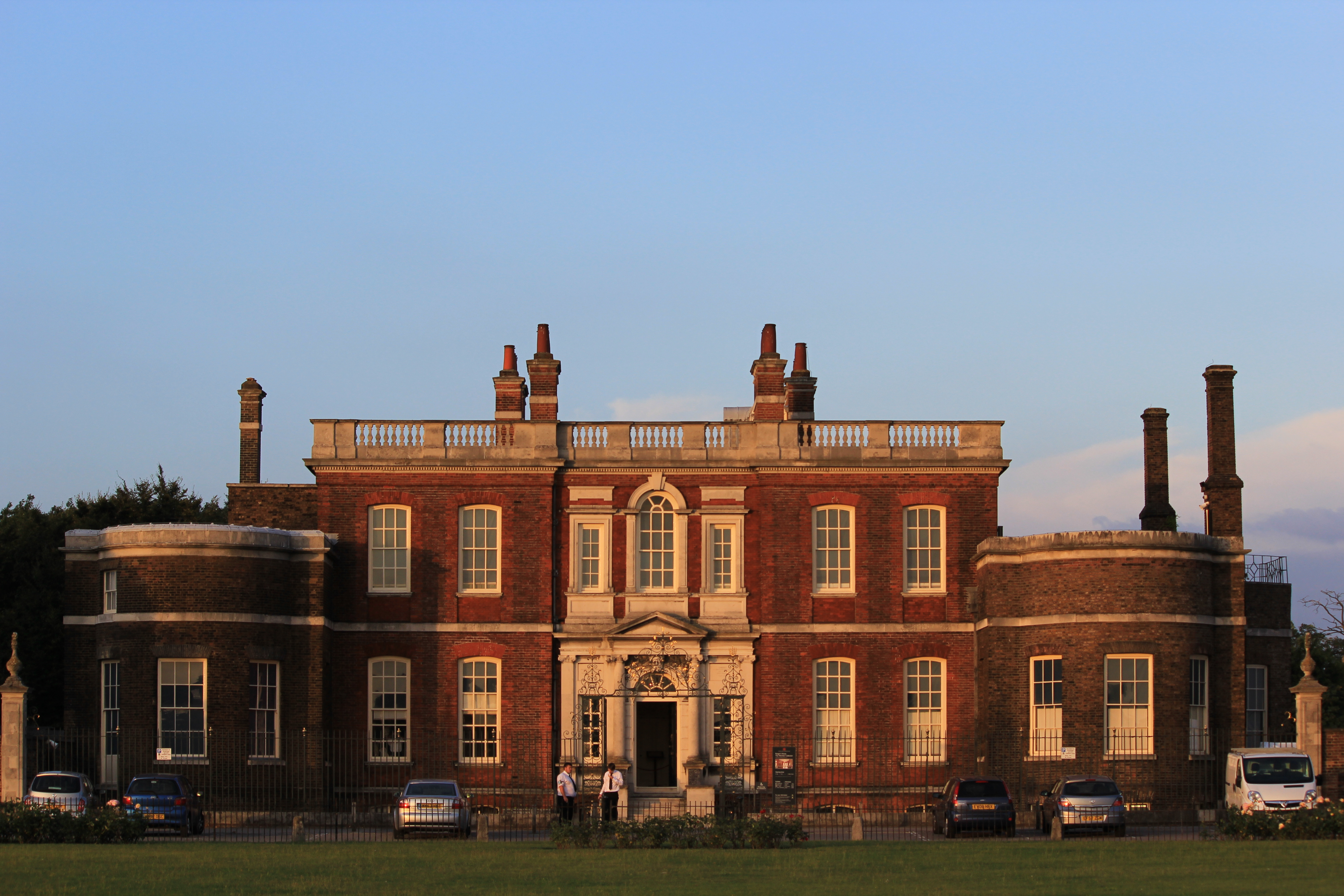
Ranger's House is a Georgian mansion built in 1722 by John James for Vice-Admiral Francis Hosier.

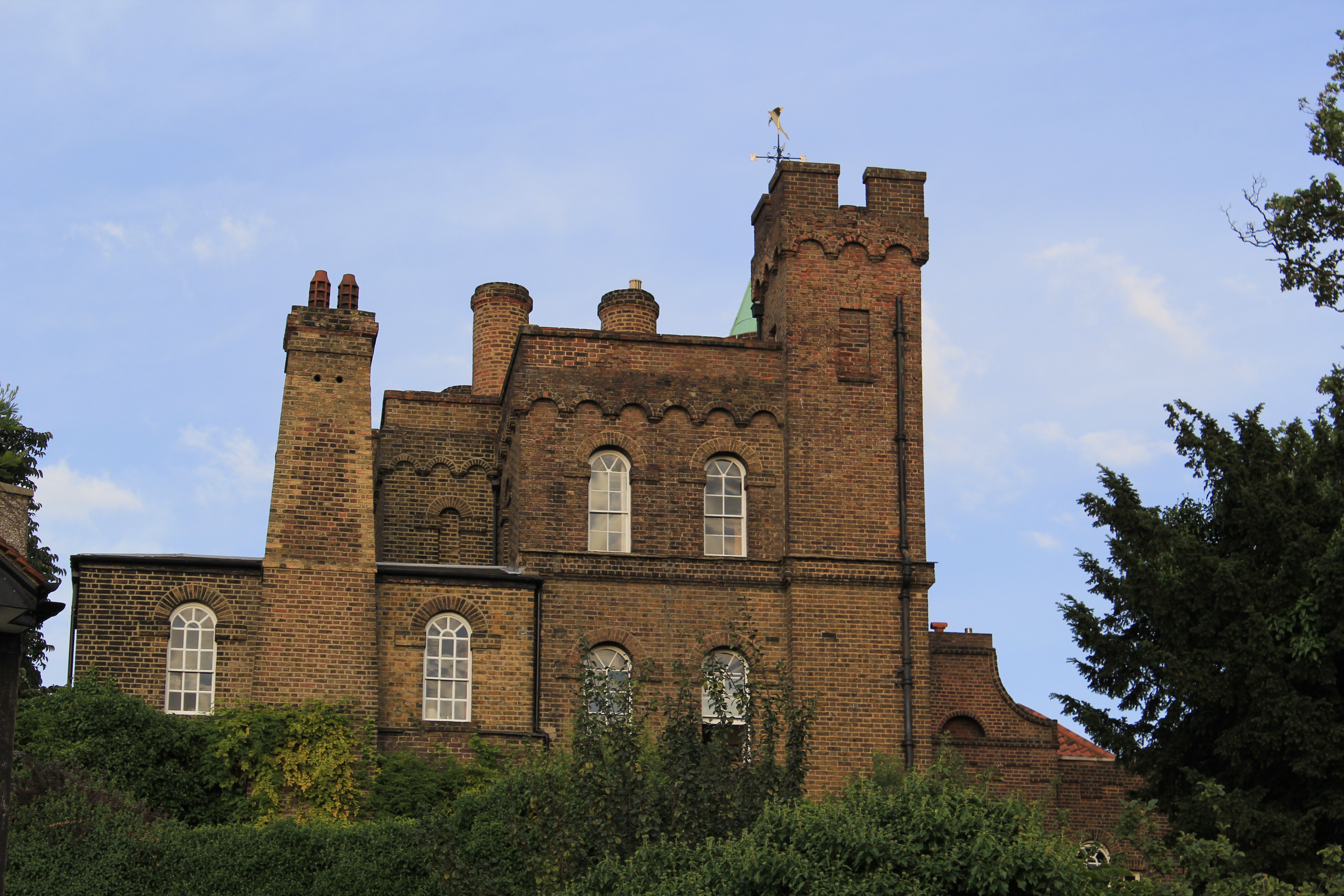
Vanbrugh Castle is a mansion built in 1719 by Sir John Vanbrugh for his own family in a medieval revival style.

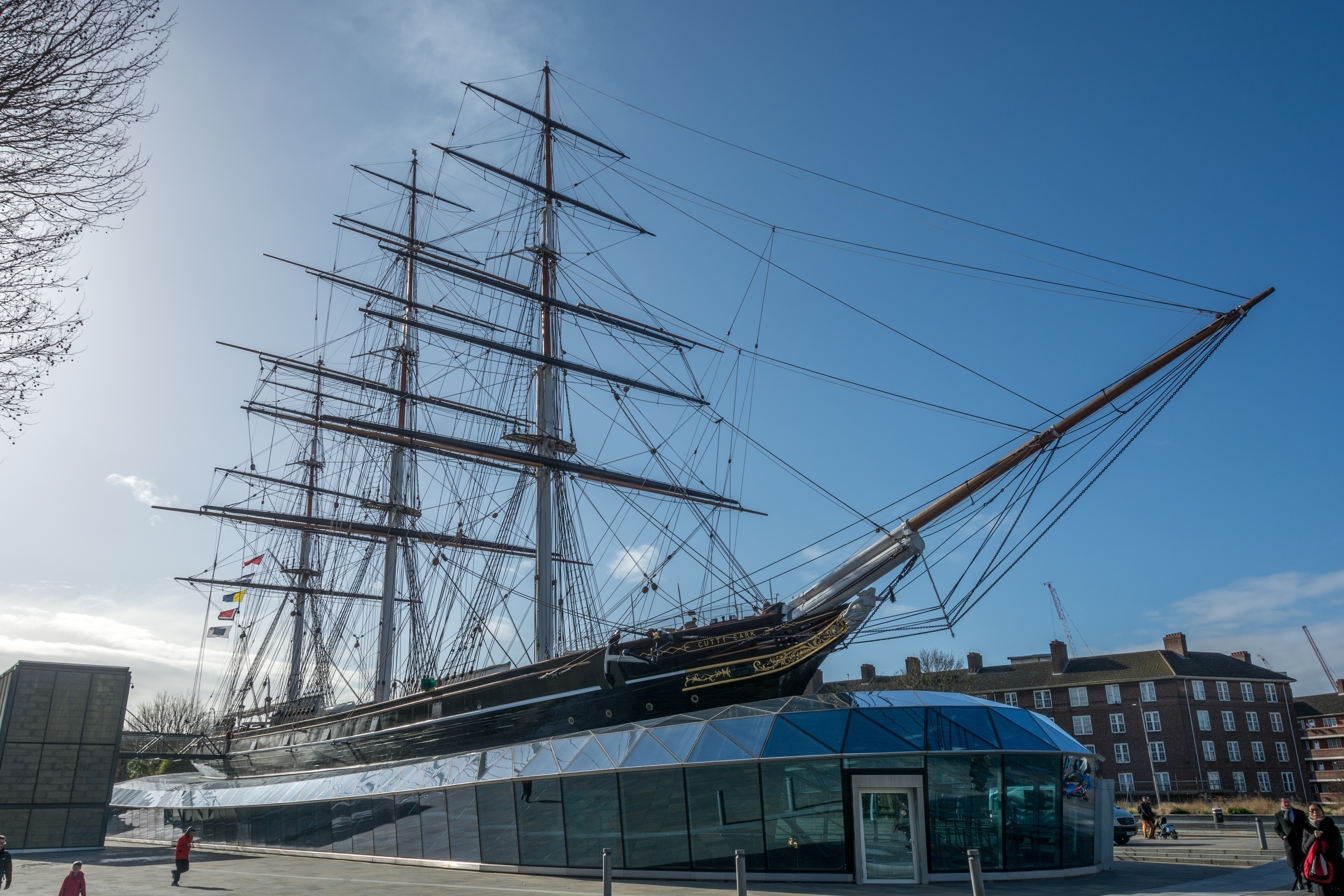
Cutty Sark, built by Hercules Linton and laid down in 1869, was one of the last and fastest British tea clippers.

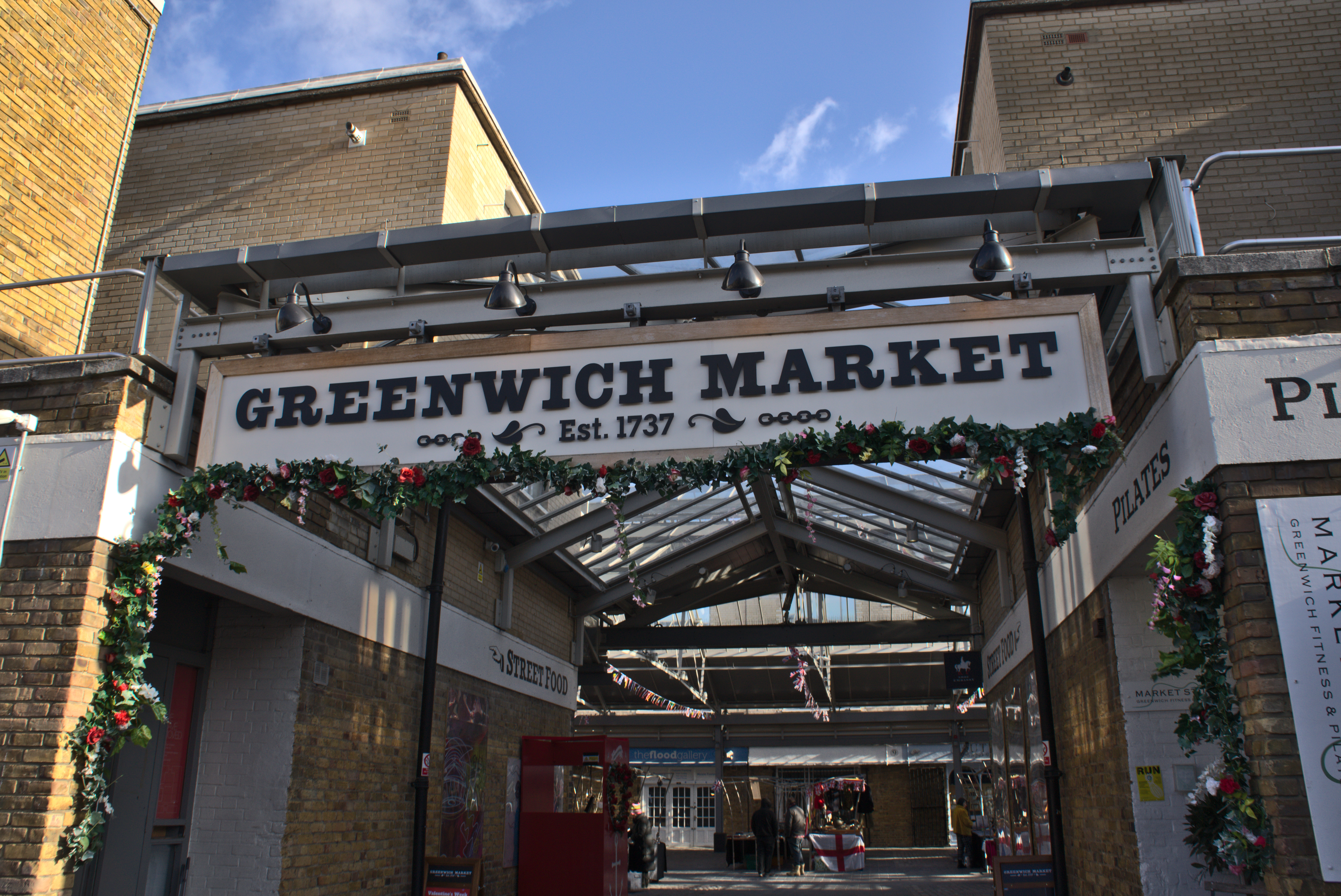
Greenwich Market first began trading in the 14th century. In 1700, a Royal Charter was granted establishing it as a regulated market and officially opened in 1737.

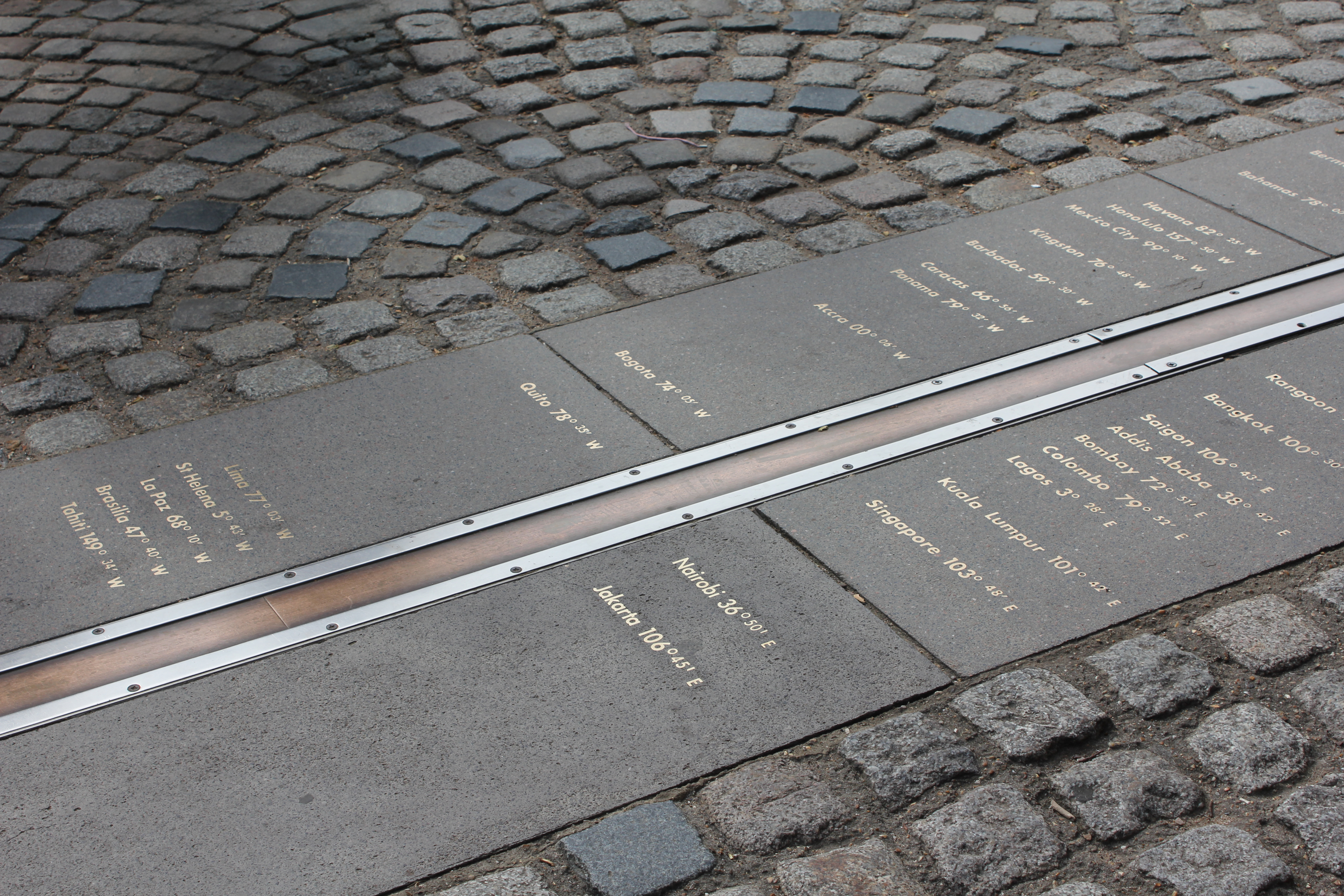
The Greenwich Meridian at the Royal Observatory was adopted as the Prime Meridian in 1884.

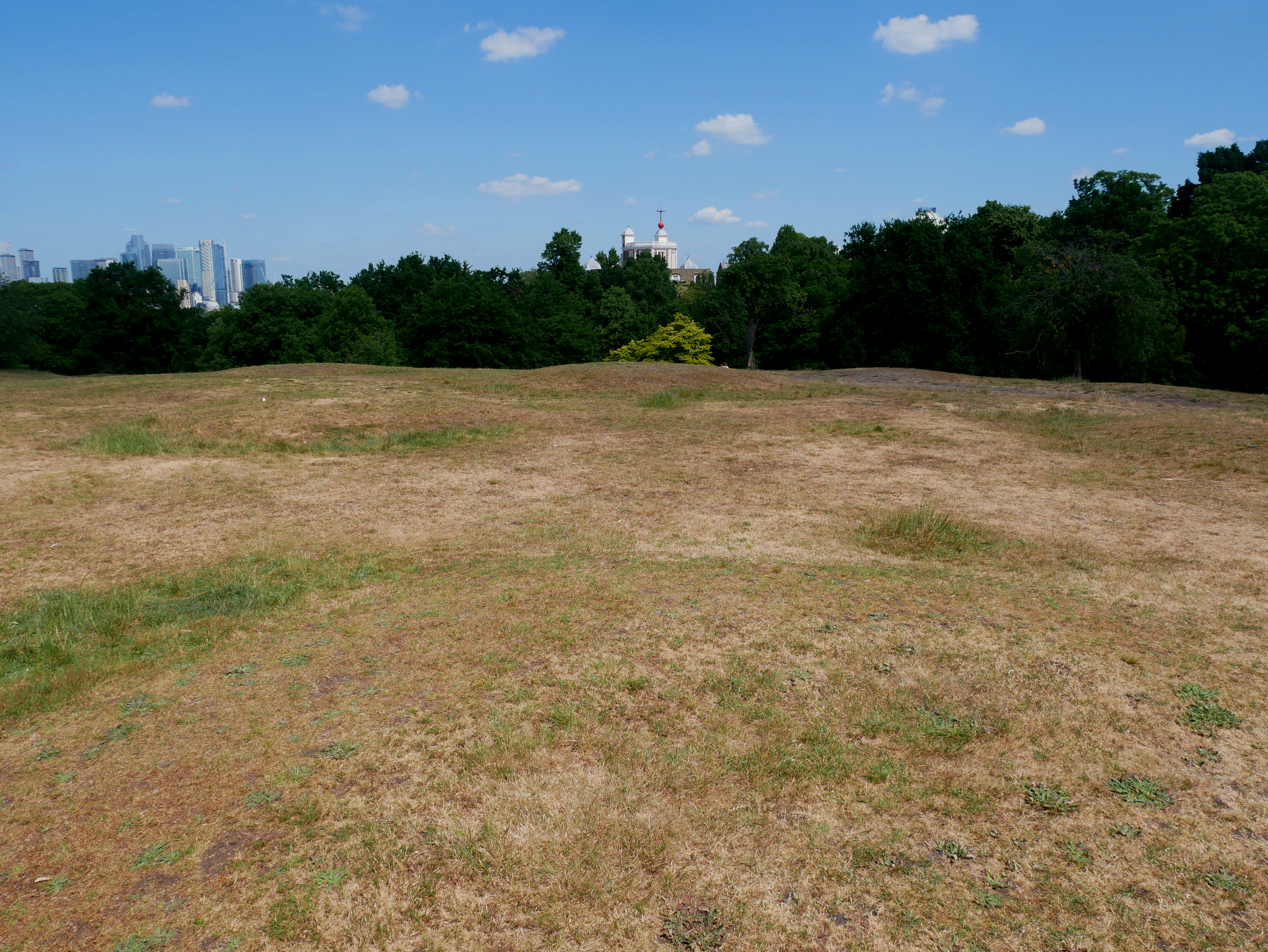
Large Anglo-Saxon burial ground in Greenwich Park dating back to between AD 480 and AD 700.

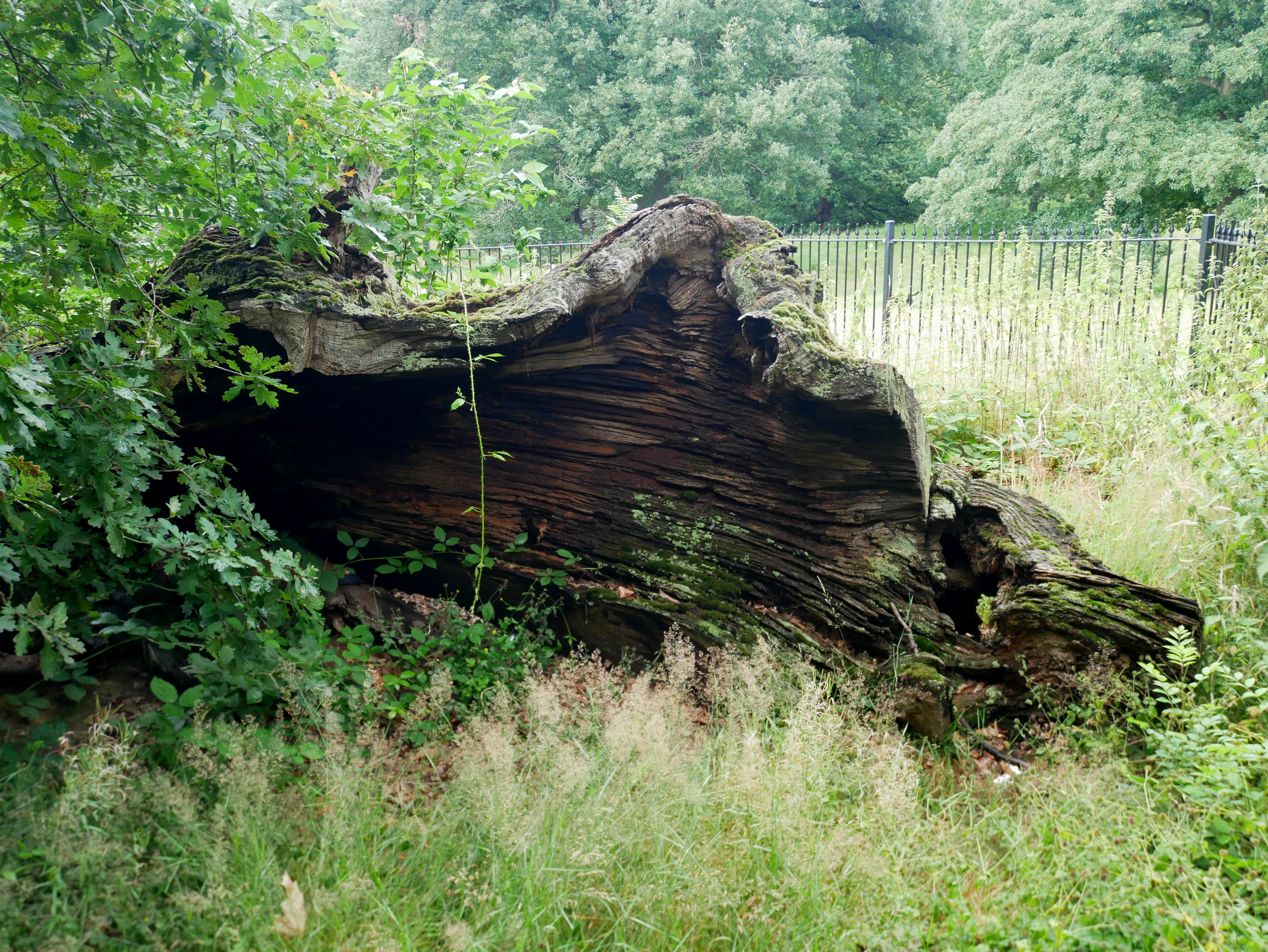
12th century oak tree where Queen Elizabeth I picnicked. Henry VIII and Anne Boleyn also courted around the tree.

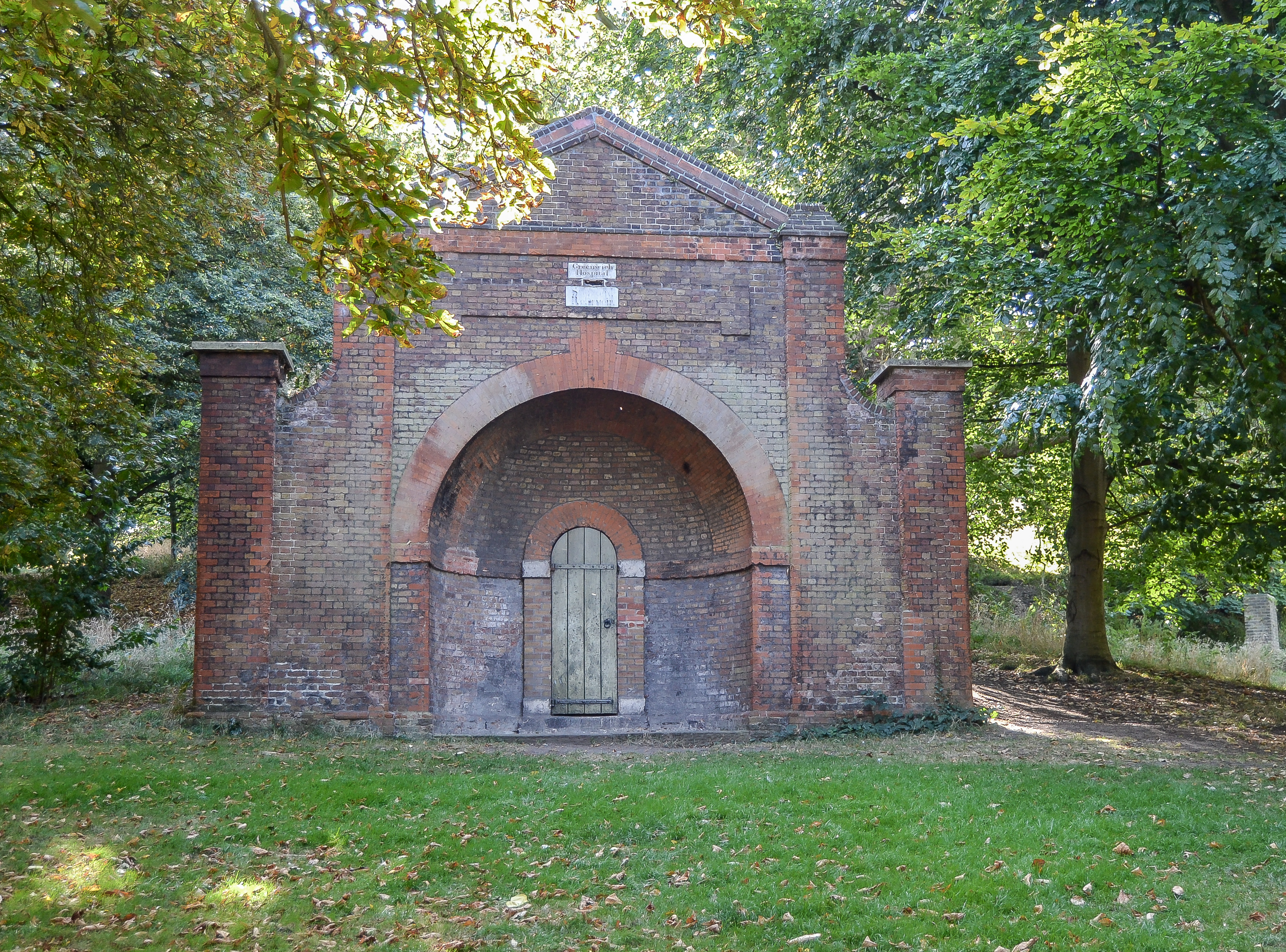
Reservoir designed by Nicholas Hawksmoor, fed by the historic underground waterways in Greenwich Park, it once supplied water to Greenwich Hospital.

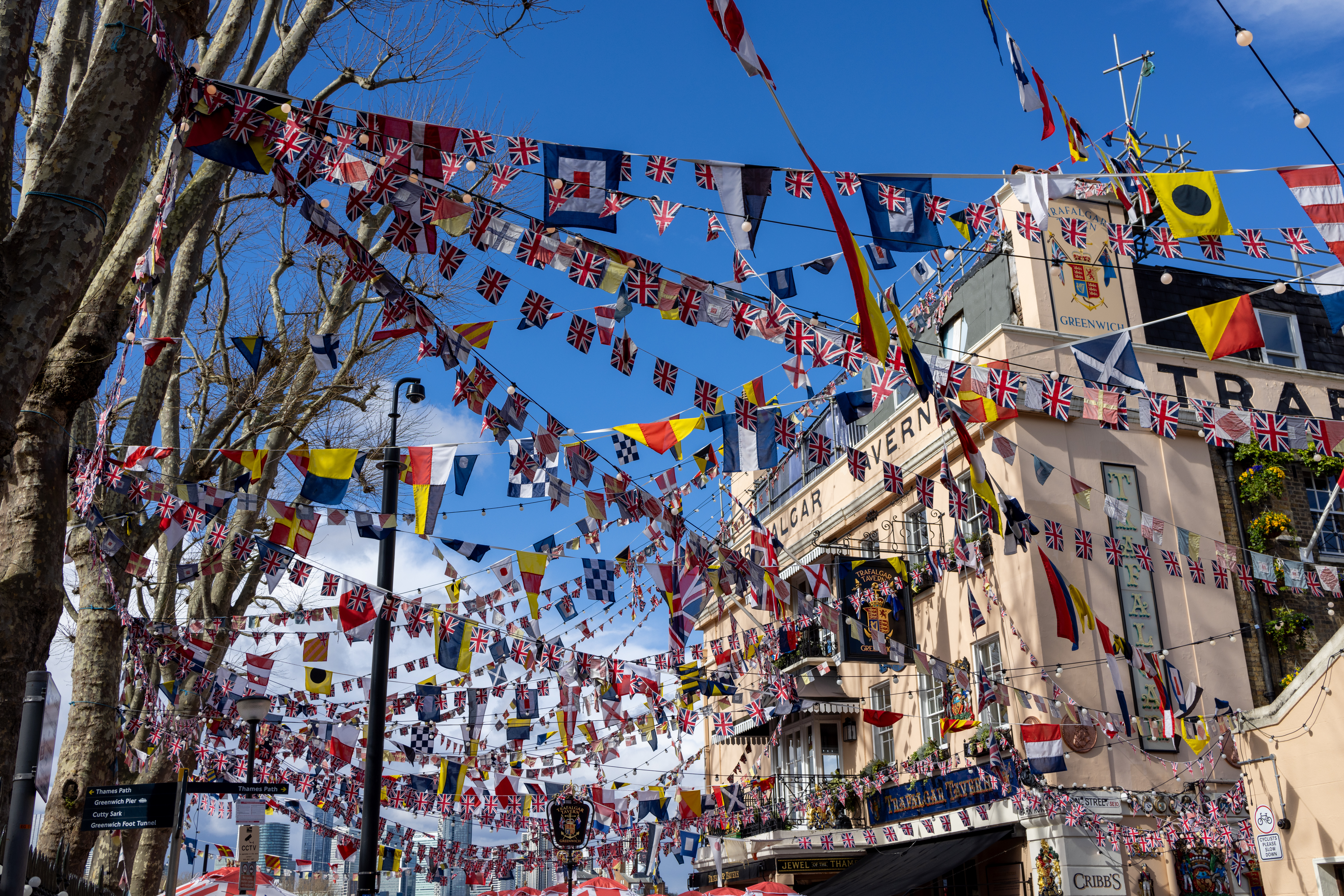
The Trafalgar Tavern, built in 1837 by architect Joseph Kay, became a fashionable Victorian riverside destination attracting politicians and writers like Charles Dickens.
Buildings located within the boundaries of the Zone of Legal Protection of Maritime Greenwich.

Following the designation, property values in the surrounding area rose sharply, reflecting increased international visibility, tourism, and investor interest associated with World Heritage status. Greenwich in particular experienced accelerated gentrification, and the area west of Greenwich Park – notably within the West Greenwich Conservation Area – increasingly developed into some of the more affluent residential districts of south-east London, with rising house prices, redevelopment of historic buildings, and an influx of higher-income residents reshaping the local social and economic profile. In 2025, The Telegraph named West Greenwich as the 4th best place to live in London (after Richmond Green, Marylebone, and Hampstead).

== Education ==
The University of Greenwich main campus occupies most of the grand, landmark riverside vista buildings of the former Royal Naval College. The university has other campuses at Avery Hill in Eltham and at Medway. The Greenwich campus also houses the Trinity College of Music.

Secondary schools in the area include The John Roan School, founded 1677, and St Ursula's Convent School, established 1850.

== Transport ==
=== National Rail ===
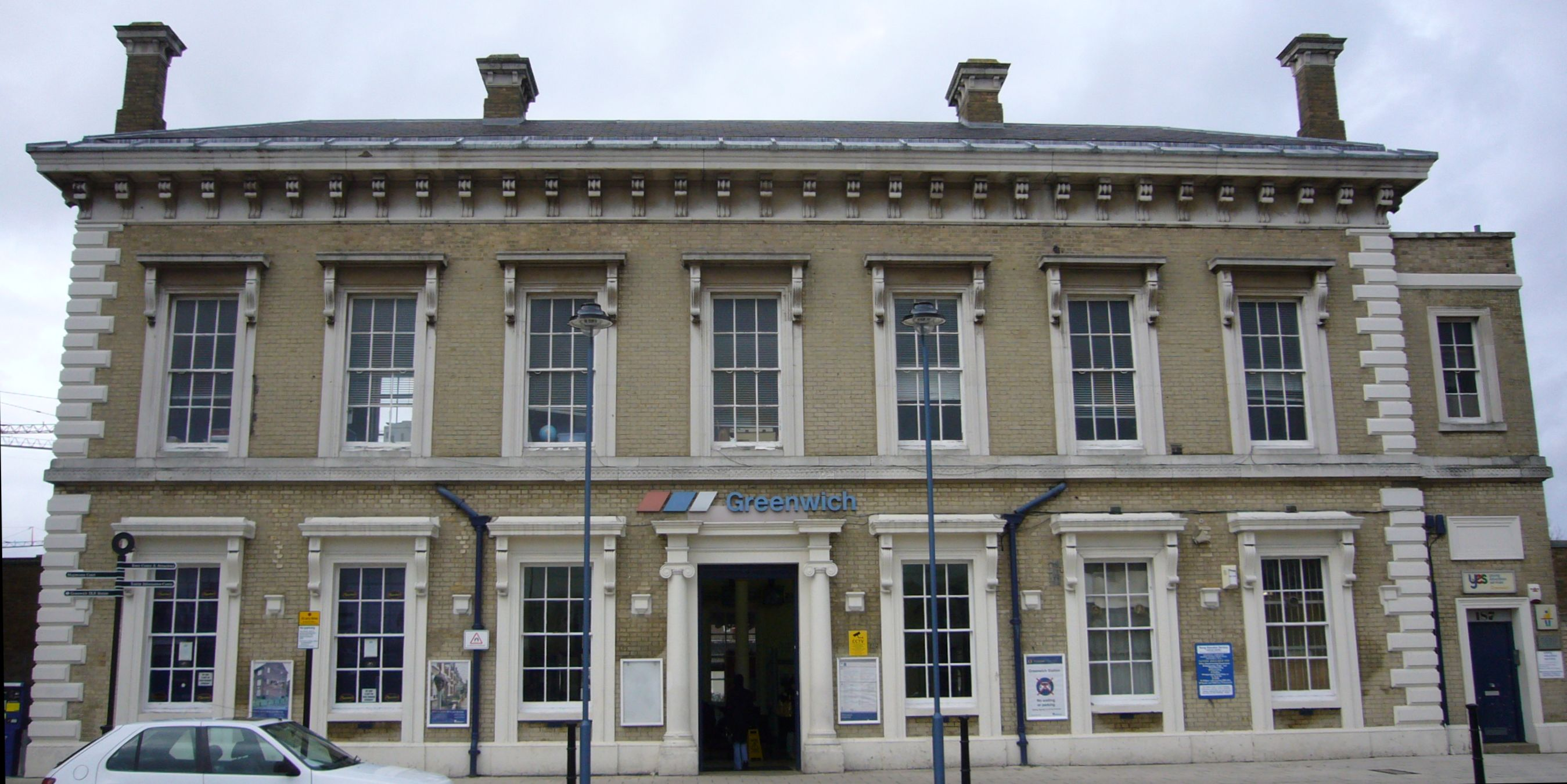
Greenwich station

Greenwich is served by Greenwich and Maze Hill stations with Southeastern services to London Cannon Street, Dartford, Barnehurst and Crayford as well as Thameslink services to Luton via London Blackfriars and to Rainham.

=== London Underground ===
The area is also served by North Greenwich station with Jubilee Line services to Stanmore and Stratford.

=== DLR ===
Greenwich is served by the Docklands Light Railway, with services from Greenwich and Cutty Sark stations to Bank via Canary Wharf and to Lewisham.

=== Buses ===
Greenwich is served by many London Buses routes.

- 129 to Lewisham Shopping Centre or Gallions Reach, Beckton
- 177 to Peckham via New Cross or to Thamesmead via Woolwich
- 188 to North Greenwich or to Russell Square via Canada Water, Elephant & Castle and Waterloo
- 199 to Bellingham via Lewisham and Catford or to Canada Water
- 286 to Sidcup via Blackheath and Eltham
- 386 to Blackheath or to Woolwich
- N1 to Tottenham Court Road station via Elephant & Castle and Waterloo or to Thamesmead via Woolwich (Night Bus)
- N199 to St Mary Cray via Lewisham, Catford, Bromley and Orpington and to Trafalgar Square via Canada Water and London Bridge (Night Bus)

=== Boat ===
There are a number of river boat services running from Greenwich Pier, managed by London River Services. The main services include the Thames commuter catamaran service run by Thames Clippers from Embankment, via Tower Millennium Pier, Canary Wharf and on to the O_{2} and Woolwich Arsenal Pier; the Westminster-Greenwich cruise service by Thames River Services; and the City Cruises tourist cruise via Westminster, Waterloo and Tower piers.

=== Pedestrian and cycle routes ===
The Thames Path National Trail runs along the riverside. The Greenwich foot tunnel provides pedestrian access to the southern end of the Isle of Dogs, across the river Thames.

The National Cycle Network Route 1 includes the foot tunnel, though cycling is not permitted in the tunnel itself.

== Sports ==
=== Rowing ===
Greenwich is home to a variety of amateur sports clubs. Its location on the tidal Thames makes it a good location for rowing; the Trafalgar Rowing Centre in Crane Street is the clubhouse of the Curlew and Globe rowing clubs. The Globe has senior and junior squads, the latter renowned for its achievements at national and international level.

=== Running ===
The Thames Path and Greenwich Park are popular with runners. The 'red start' for the London Marathon is situated south of the park on Charlton Way (other starts are nearby in St John's Park, and on Shooter's Hill Road). After heading east through Charlton and Woolwich, the marathon route then turns west towards Greenwich; as runners reach the 10 km mark (6.2-mile), they pass the Old Royal Naval College and then loop around the prow of the Cutty Sark before continuing west towards Deptford.

=== Golf ===
The Greenwich Peninsula Golf Range at North Greenwich is a riverside golf driving range with 60 bays, a mini 18-hole adventure course, golf academy, golf shop and restaurant.

== Cultural references ==
=== Music ===
Greenwich's musical heritage also includes the historic role of music in its institutions. The Royal Borough is home to the Trinity Laban Conservatoire of Music and Dance, a leading UK conservatoire formed by the 2005 merger of the Trinity College of Music and the Laban Dance Centre; its Greenwich site has educated internationally recognised musicians and composers. The Queen's House hosts classical concerts and early music performances, including Renaissance and Baroque programmes in its Great Hall.

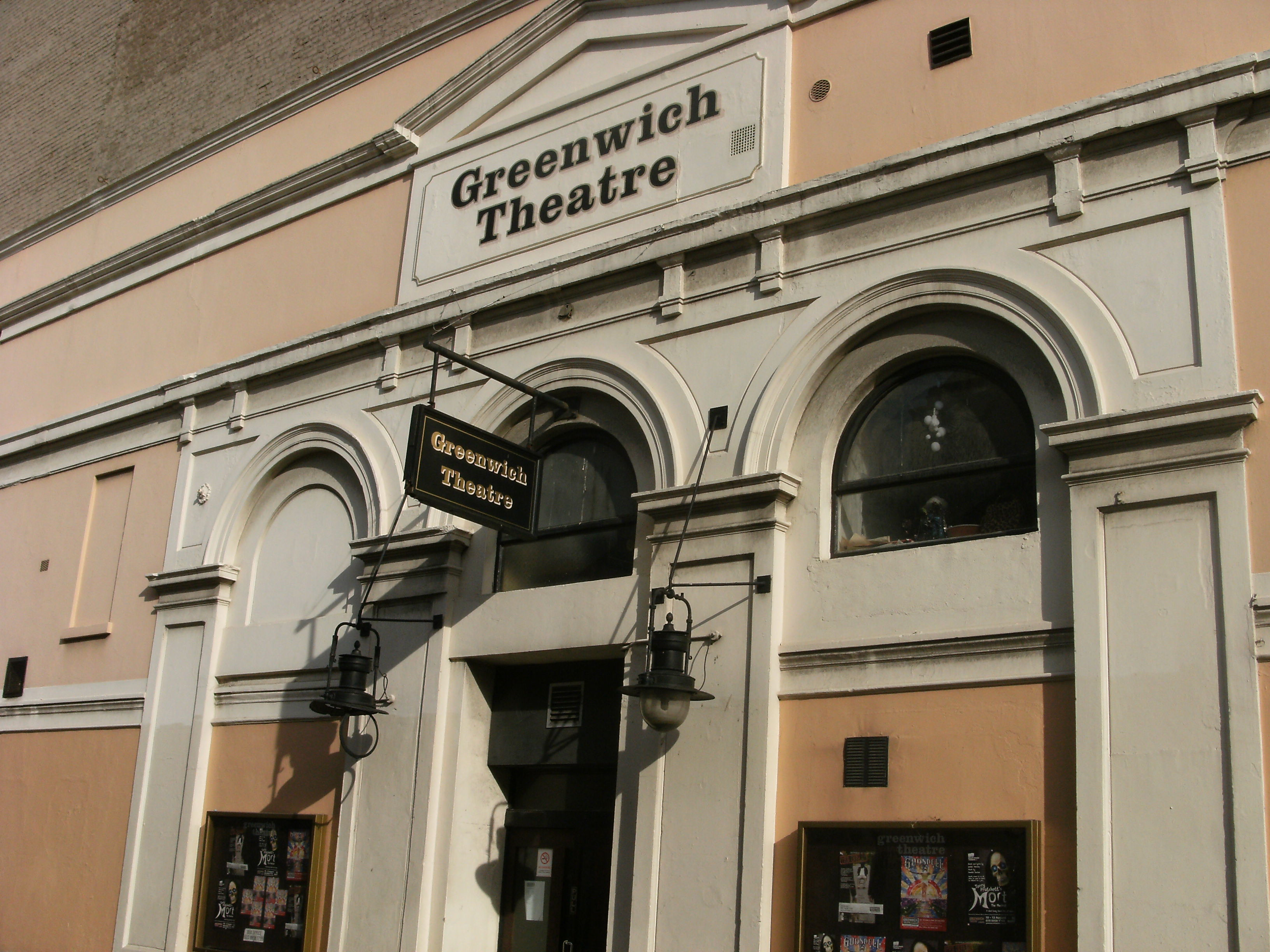
The Greenwich Theatre.

Greenwich has a long tradition of performance venues influencing its musical life. St Alfege Church has a long tradition of sacred and choral music, hosting regular services with sung liturgy, a well-regarded choir led by a Director of Music, and free lunchtime recitals that feature classical and vocal performances; the church is also notable as the burial place of the 16th-century composer Thomas Tallis. The Greenwich Theatre traces its origins to the 19th century as the Rose and Crown Music Hall and later Crowder's Music Hall, showcasing concerts, burlesque and variety acts.

The wider cultural scene also intersects with music through multidisciplinary festivals like the Greenwich+Docklands International Festival, which blends outdoor performance art with music during its annual summer programme. Greenwich has also been referenced directly in contemporary jazz work: South London keyboardist, composer and producer James Beckwith titled his album SE10 after the Greenwich postcode, describing it as dedicated to the Greenwich area where he lives and studied at Trinity Laban.

Inheriting from the dynamic electronic music scene in south-east London, the area has also been used as a setting for live music and promotional events in the genre. The Royal Naval College is the location of the electronic music festival Labyrinth on the Thames, using the river and its surroundings in Greenwich as a backdrop for an immersive musical experience. Its past headliners include the Grammy Award–winning DJ Black Coffee,, Moby and Peggy Gou, reflecting the festival's mix of internationally renowned DJs and live electronic acts.

=== Film and television ===
Greenwich, particularly the World Heritage Site and the Royal Naval College, have been used extensively as filming locations for film and television productions.

Notable productions filmed at the Royal Naval College include Thor: The Dark World, Les Misérables, Skyfall, The Dark Knight Rises, and the television series Bridgerton and The Crown. Bridgerton was also filmed at the Ranger's House.

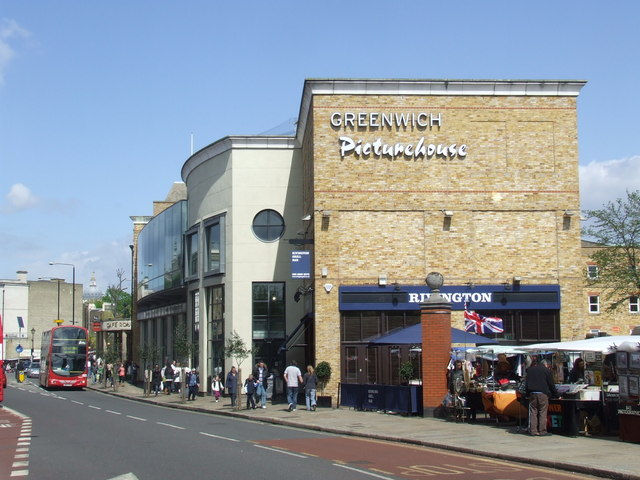
The Greenwich Picturehouse.

In January 2026, entertainment press reported that filming for Avengers: Doomsday took place in Greenwich, including at the Royal Naval College.

Greenwich Picturehouse is an independent cinema on Greenwich High Road that has played a notable role in the area's film culture. It originally opened in 1989 as the Greenwich Cinema, a purpose-built multi-screen venue, but closed in 2002 following increased competition from larger multiplex cinemas. The building was subsequently refurbished and reopened in 2005 as Greenwich Picturehouse, expanding to five screens and adding a café and bar. Since its reopening, the cinema has become an established cultural venue in the borough, screening a mix of mainstream releases, independent and foreign-language films, documentaries, and special events, and hosting festivals and community-focused programmes that contribute to Greenwich's wider cultural life.

=== Literature ===
- Greenwich Park (2021), a psychological thriller by Katherine Faulkner, is set in and around Greenwich Park.
- On the Greenwich Line (2019; English edition 2025), a novel by Shady Lewis, uses the Greenwich line/meridian as a key motif while exploring contemporary London life and bureaucracy.
- Greenwich: The Place Where Days Begin and End (2000), a non-fiction history by Charles Jennings, discusses Greenwich's development and global significance as the reference point for time and longitude.
- Edward Lear makes reference to Greenwich in More Nonsense Pictures, Rhymes, Botany, etc.

== Notable residents ==
A few notable residents of Greenwich by chronological order
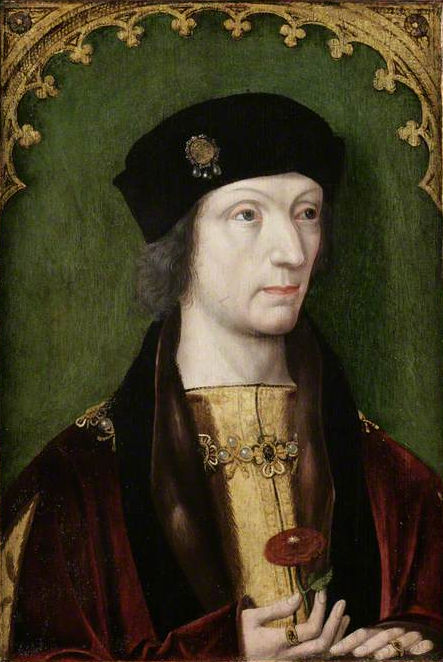
Henry VII (1485-1509) was King of England from 1485 until his death. Although he was not born in Greenwich, the Palace of Placentia there became an important royal residence during his reign and the birthplace of two of his children.

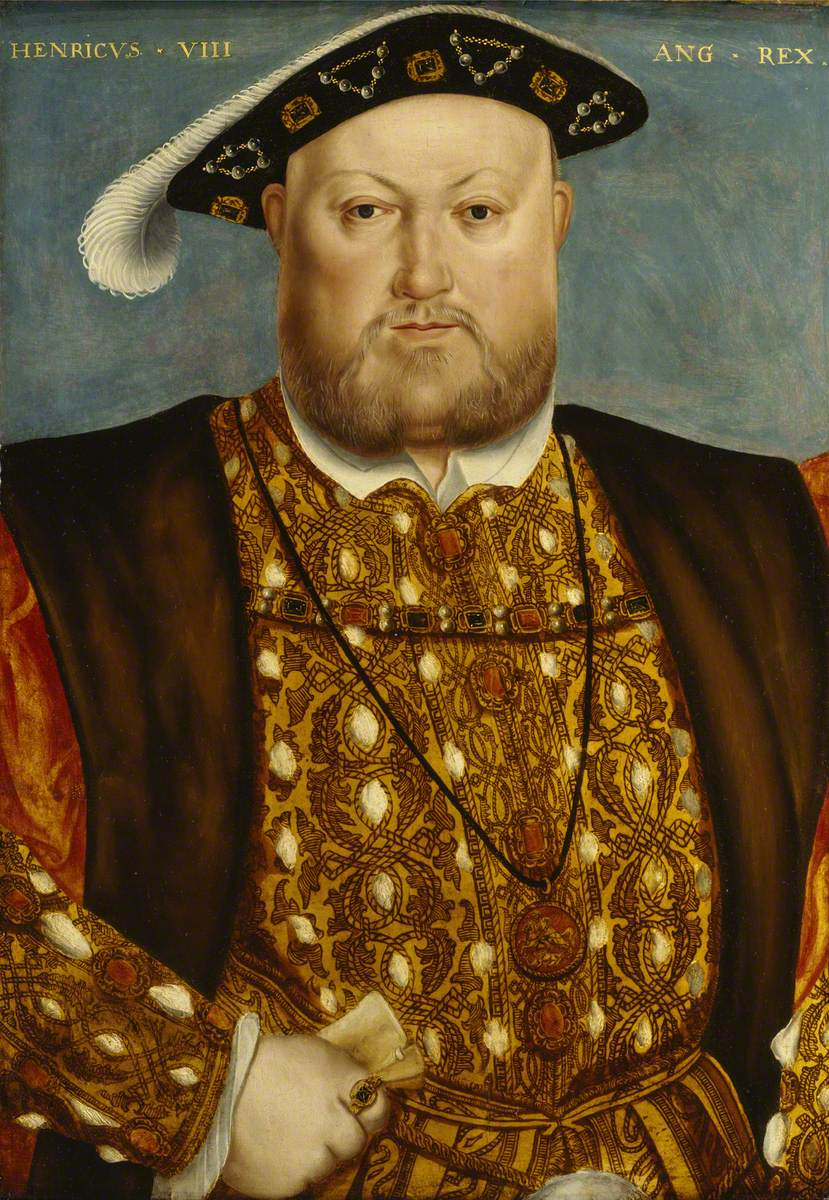
Henry VIII (1491-1547) was born at the Palace of Placentia in Greenwich in 1491. During his reign the palace became one of the principal royal residences of the Tudor court and a major centre of political, diplomatic, and ceremonial life in England.

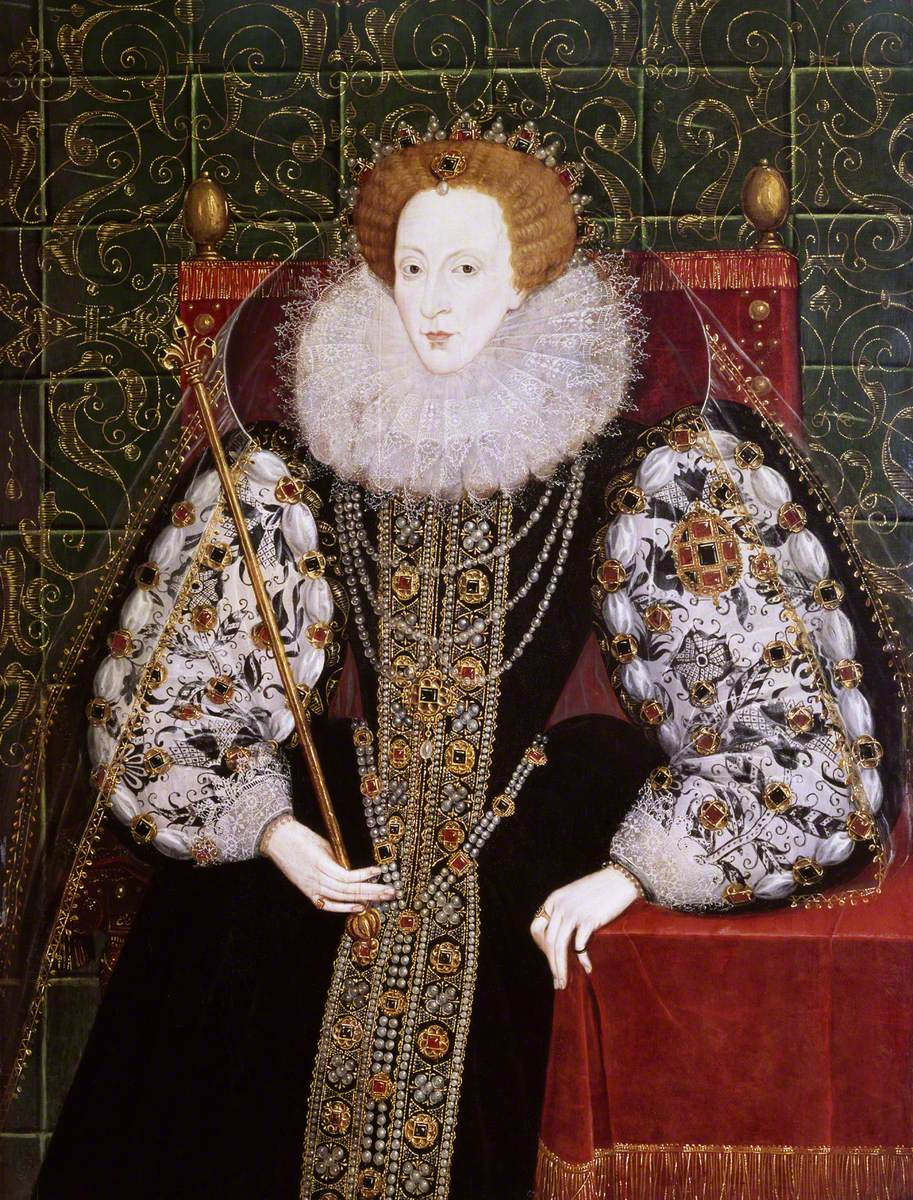
Elizabeth I (1533-1603) was born at the Palace of Placentia in Greenwich in 1533. The palace remained an important royal residence during her reign and was closely associated with the formative years of her rule.

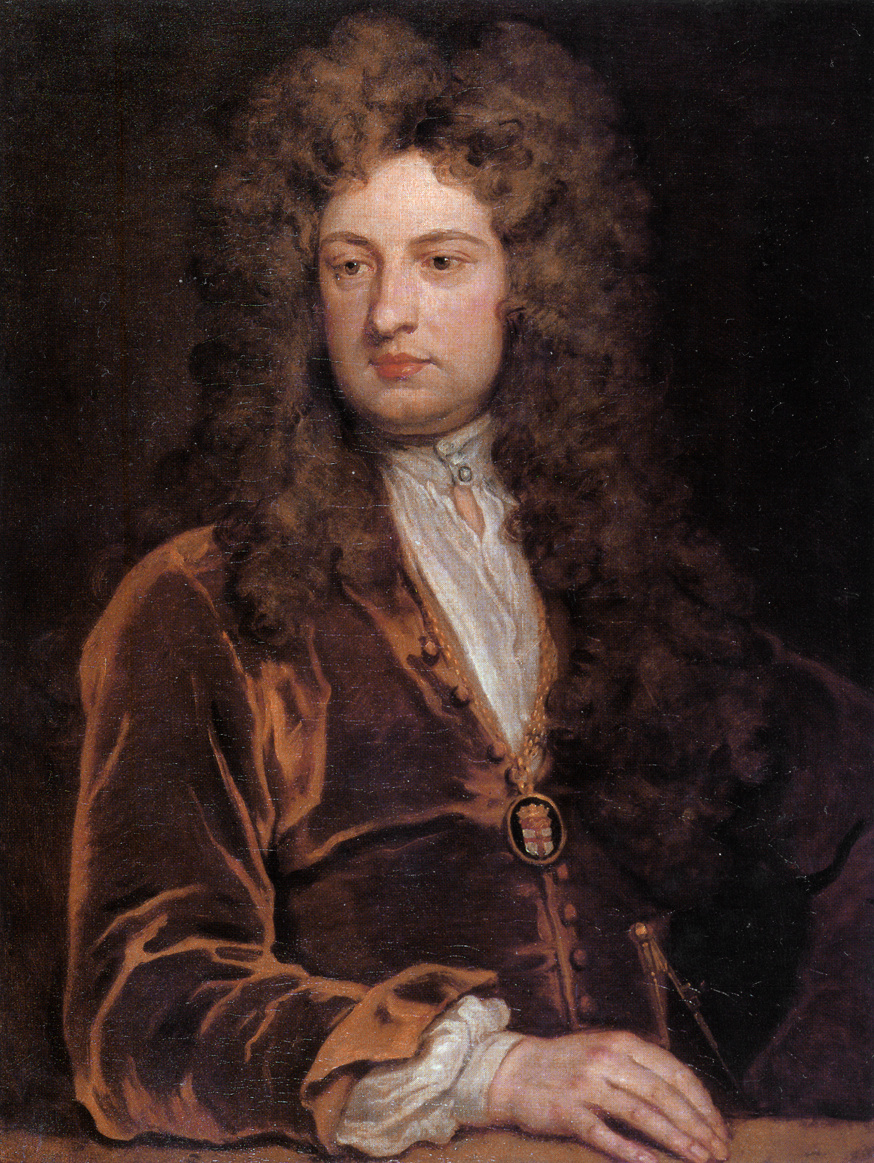
John Vanbrugh (1664-1726) lived for a period in Greenwich during the early 18th century, when the area was an important centre of architectural activity. He is best known as a leading figure of the English Baroque, responsible for major buildings such as Blenheim Palace and Castle Howard.

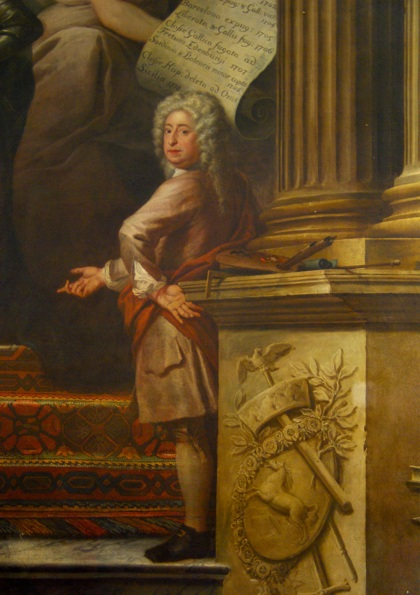
James Thornhill (1675–1734) was an English Baroque painter who lived in Greenwich noted for his large decorative schemes, including the Painted Hall at the Royal Naval College. He was the first English-born artist to be knighted.

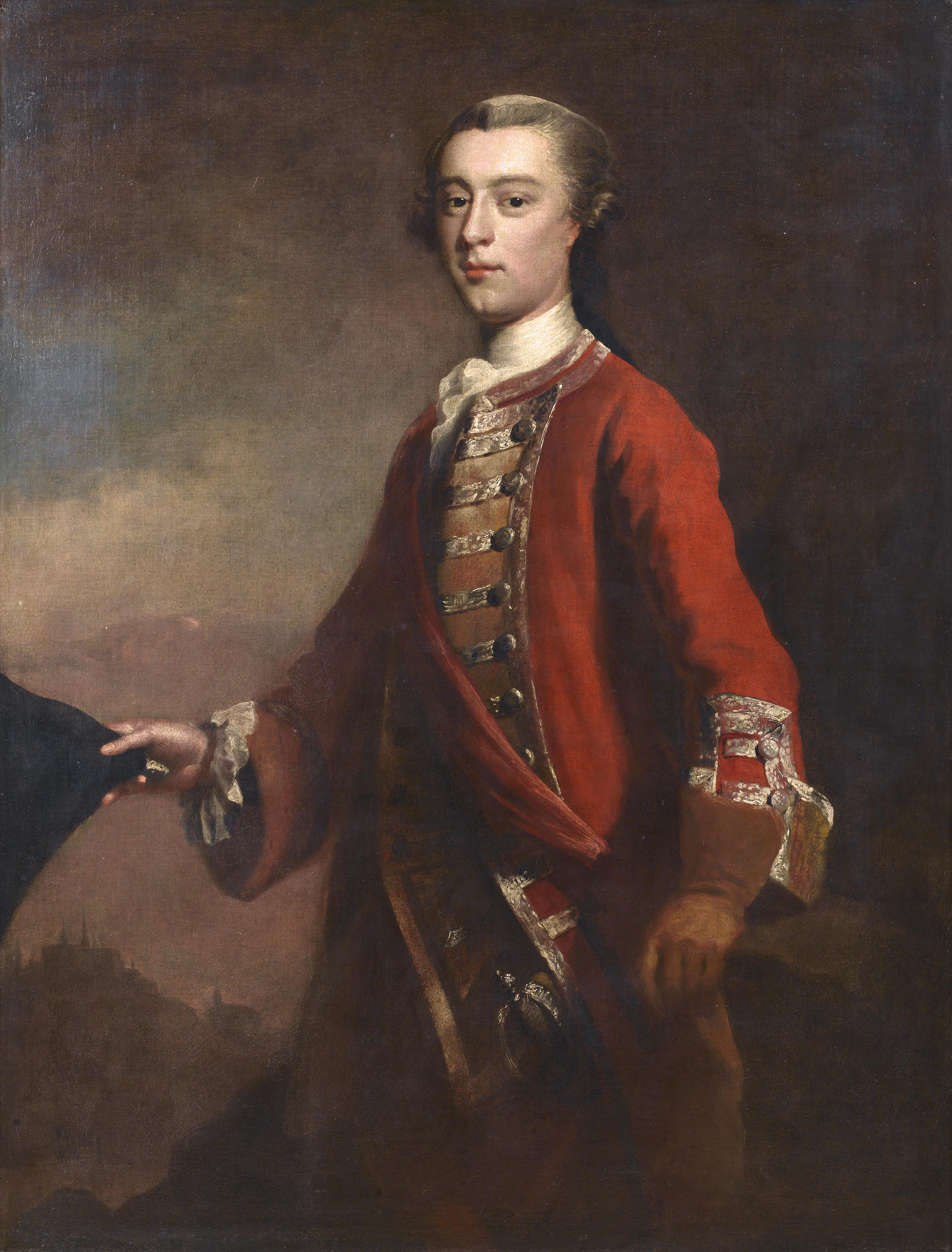
James Wolfe (1727-1759) lived for a time in Greenwich while serving as an officer in the British Army, at a period when the town was closely associated with military and naval administration. He is best remembered for his command at the Battle of the Plains of Abraham in 1759 during the Seven Years' War, which secured British control of Quebec, Canada.

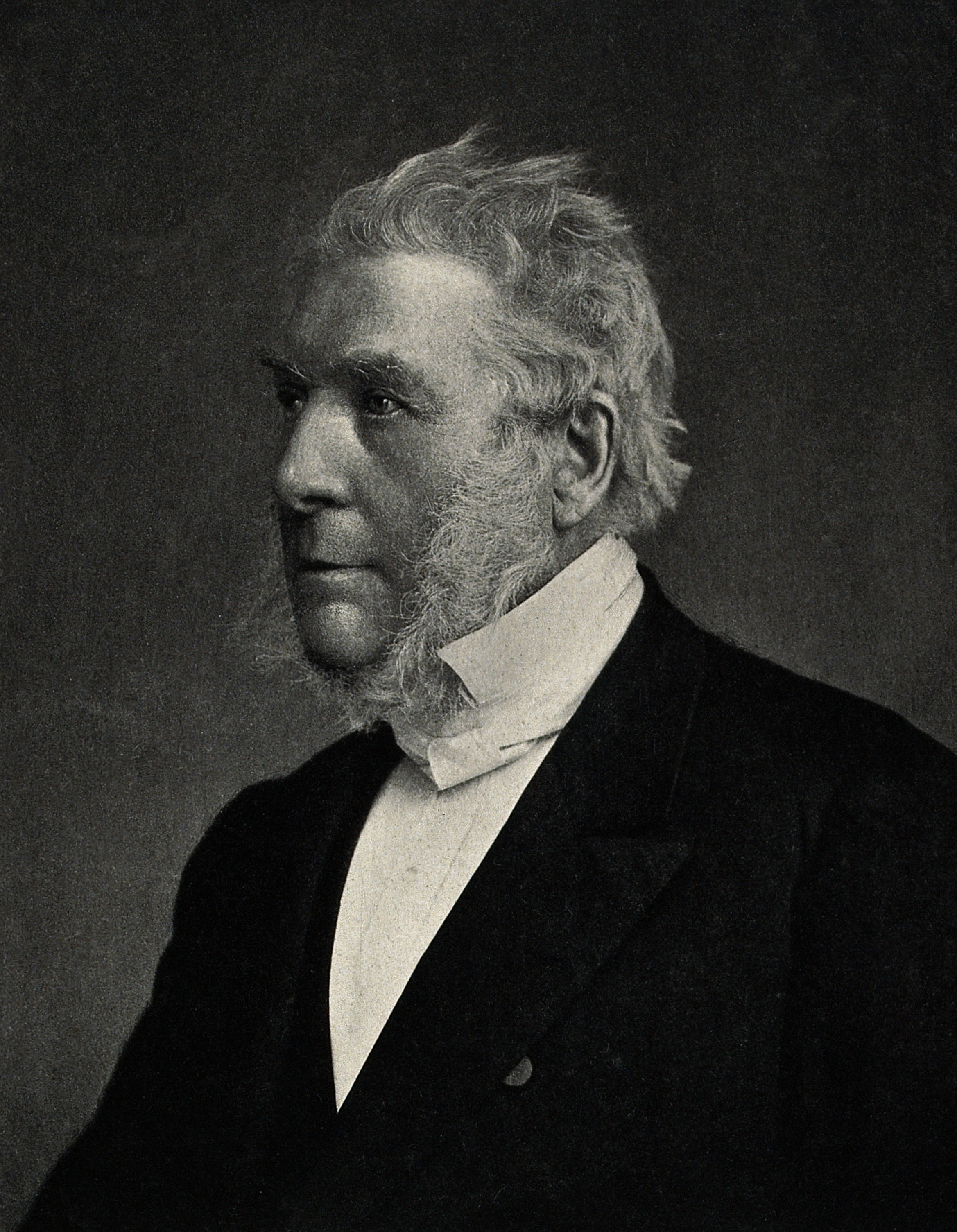
James Glaisher (1809-1903) was based for much of his career at the Royal Observatory, where he worked as a meteorologist. He is best known for his pioneering high-altitude balloon ascents in the 1860s, which advanced the scientific study of the atmosphere. He lived at 20 Dartmouth Hill.

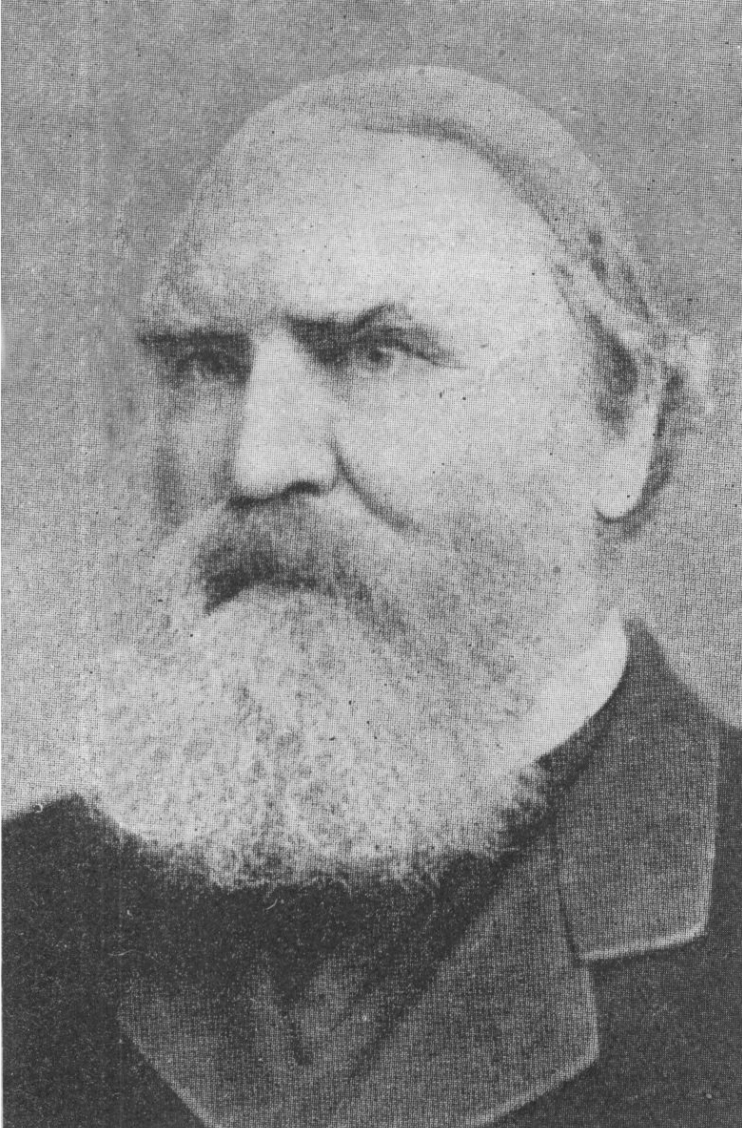
Frederick Brearey (1816-1896) lived on Maidenstone Hill and was a pioneer of British aeronautics. As a co-founder of the Aeronautical Society of Great Britain, he promoted early research into heavier-than-air flight and helped establish aviation as a scientific discipline.

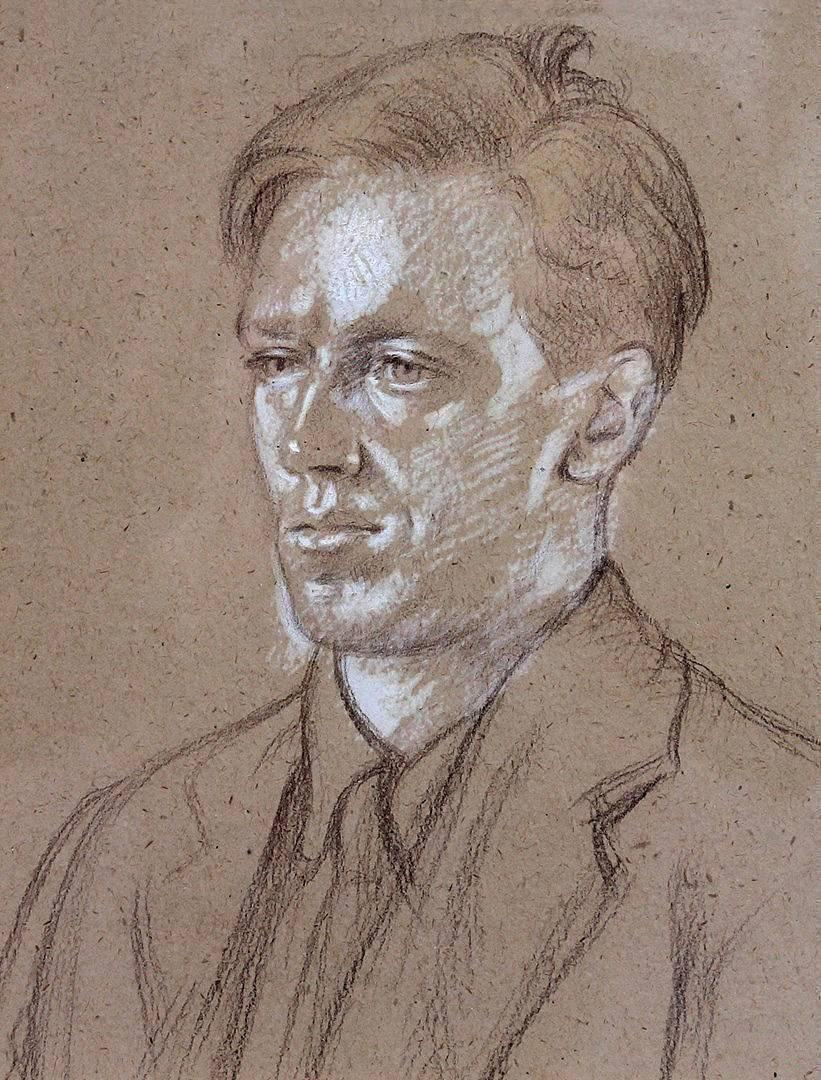
Cecil Day-Lewis (1904-1972) was an Anglo-Irish poet and novelist who served as Poet Laureate of the United Kingdom from 1968 until his death. He lived at 6 Croom's Hill, where he wrote much of his later work and where an English Heritage blue plaque now commemorates him.

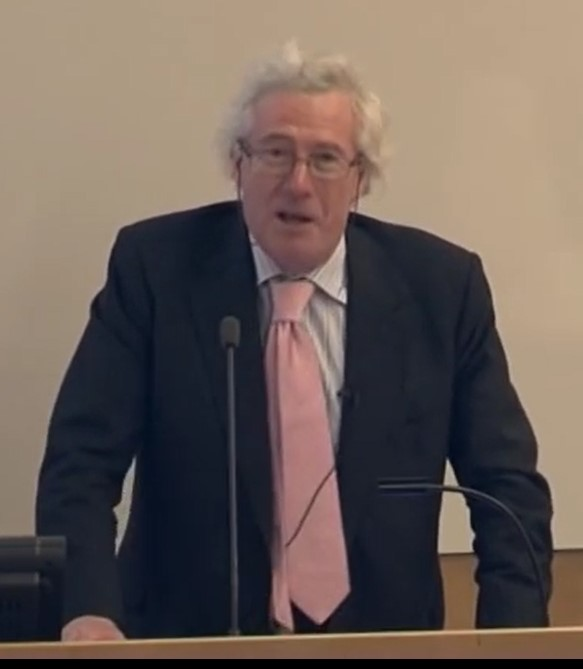
Lord Sumption (born 1948) lives on Crooms Hill in Greenwich. He is a former senior judge who sat on the Supreme Court of the United Kingdom between 2012 and 2018 and on the Hong Kong Court of Final Appeal between 2019 and 2024.

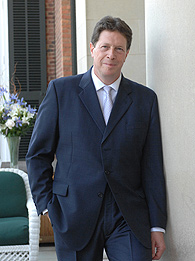
Sir Nigel Sheinwald (born 1953) lives in West Greenwich. He is a former British diplomat who was British Ambassador to the United States between 2007 and 2012.

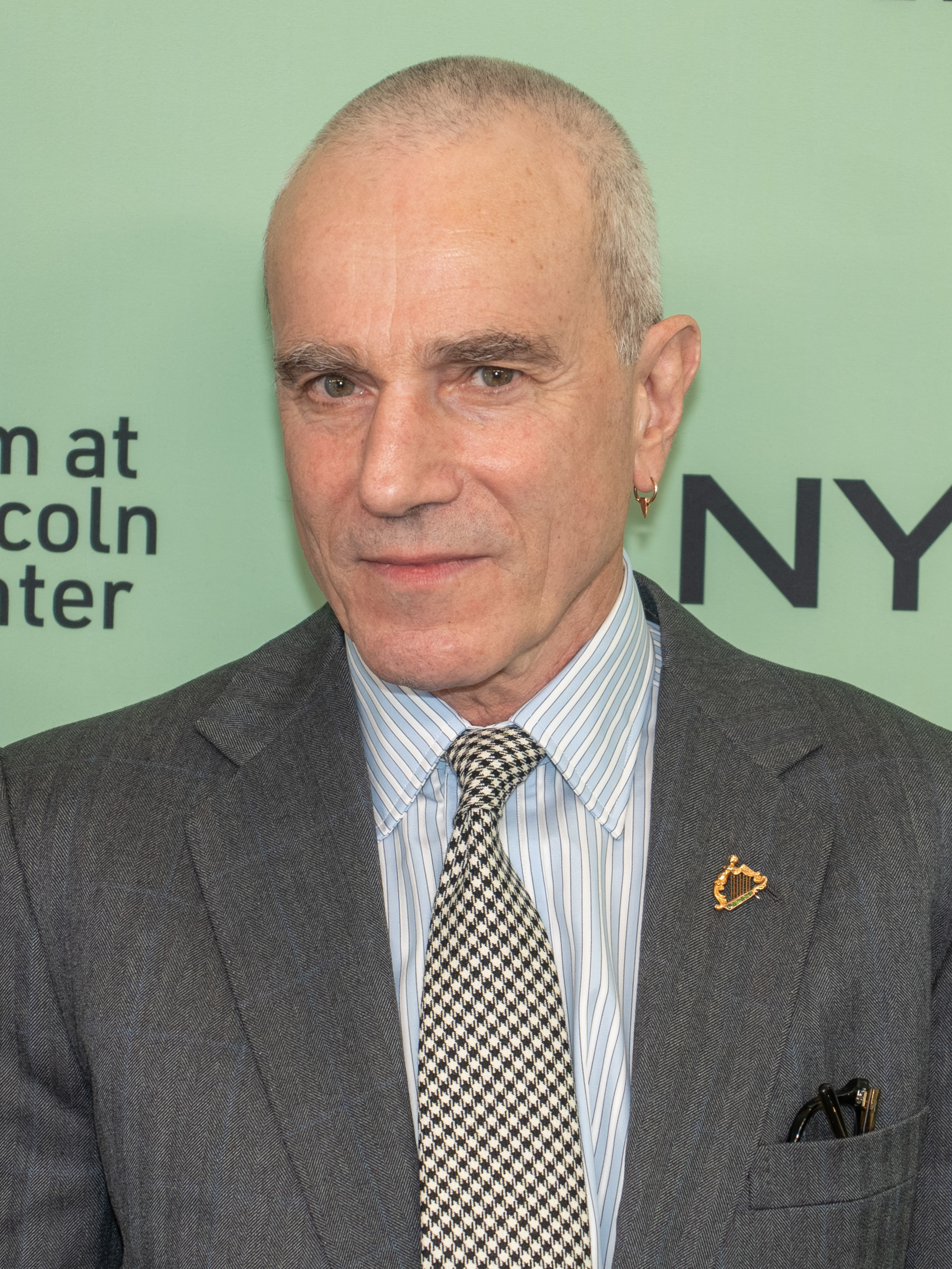
Daniel Day-Lewis (born 1957) is an English actor who grew up at 6 Croom's Hill in West Greenwich and is known for his work in film and theatre, including award-winning performances in My Left Foot, There Will Be Blood, and Lincoln.

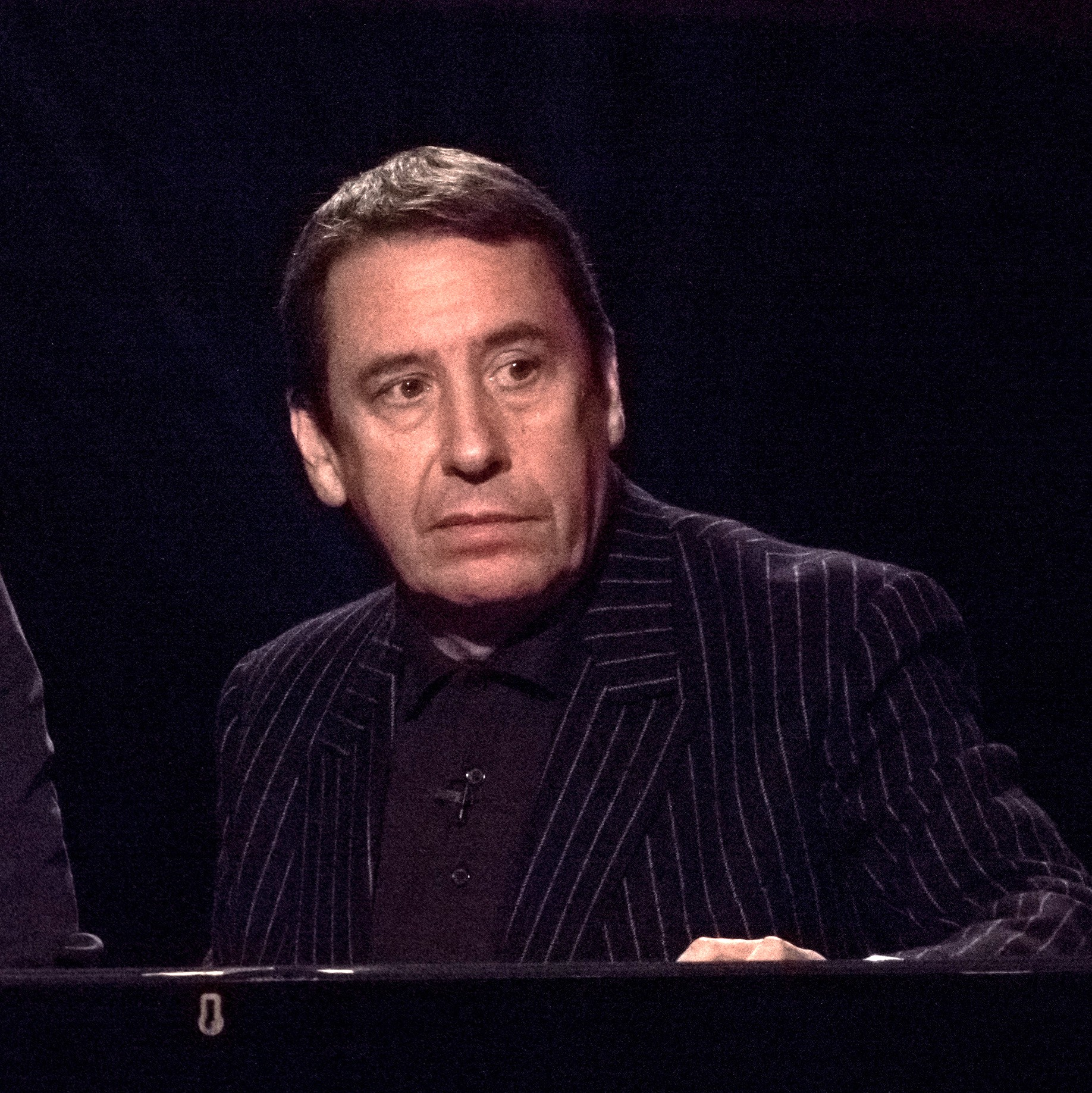
Jools Holland (born 1958) is an English musician, bandleader, and television presenter, best known as the host of Later... with Jools Holland. He has been based in the Greenwich area, including Westcombe Park near Greenwich Park, where he has maintained a recording studio and worked extensively with British and international musicians.

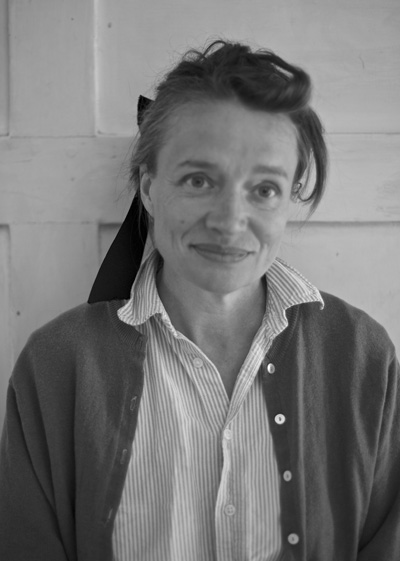
Emily Patrick (born 1959) lives in Greenwich. She is a British figurative painter, known for portraits, landscapes, and still lifes, and noted for her 1987 commission to paint Diana, Princess of Wales.

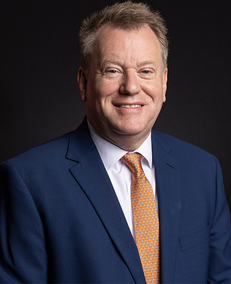
The Lord Frost (born 1965) is a British diplomat and politician living in West Greenwich. He served as British Ambassador to Denmark, Secretary of State for Exiting the European Union and is now a Member of the House of Lords.

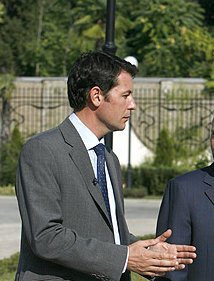
Matthew Chance (born 1970) is a resident of West Greenwich. He is a British journalist, and works as the Chief Global Affairs Correspondent for the CNN network.

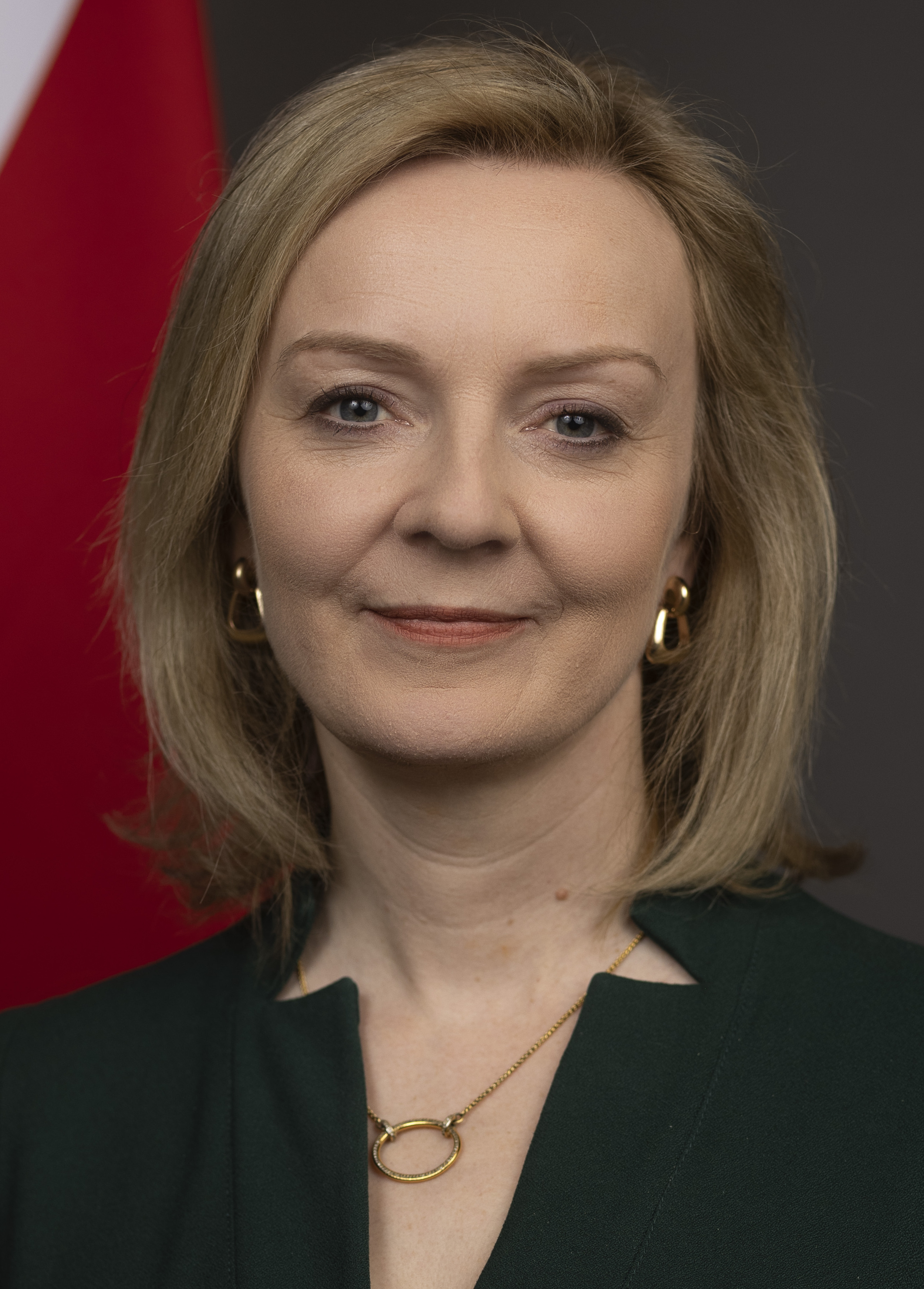
Liz Truss (born 1975) is a resident of West Greenwich. She served as 56th Prime Minister of the United Kingdom in 2022, becoming the shortest-serving prime minister in British history following her resignation after 49 days in office.

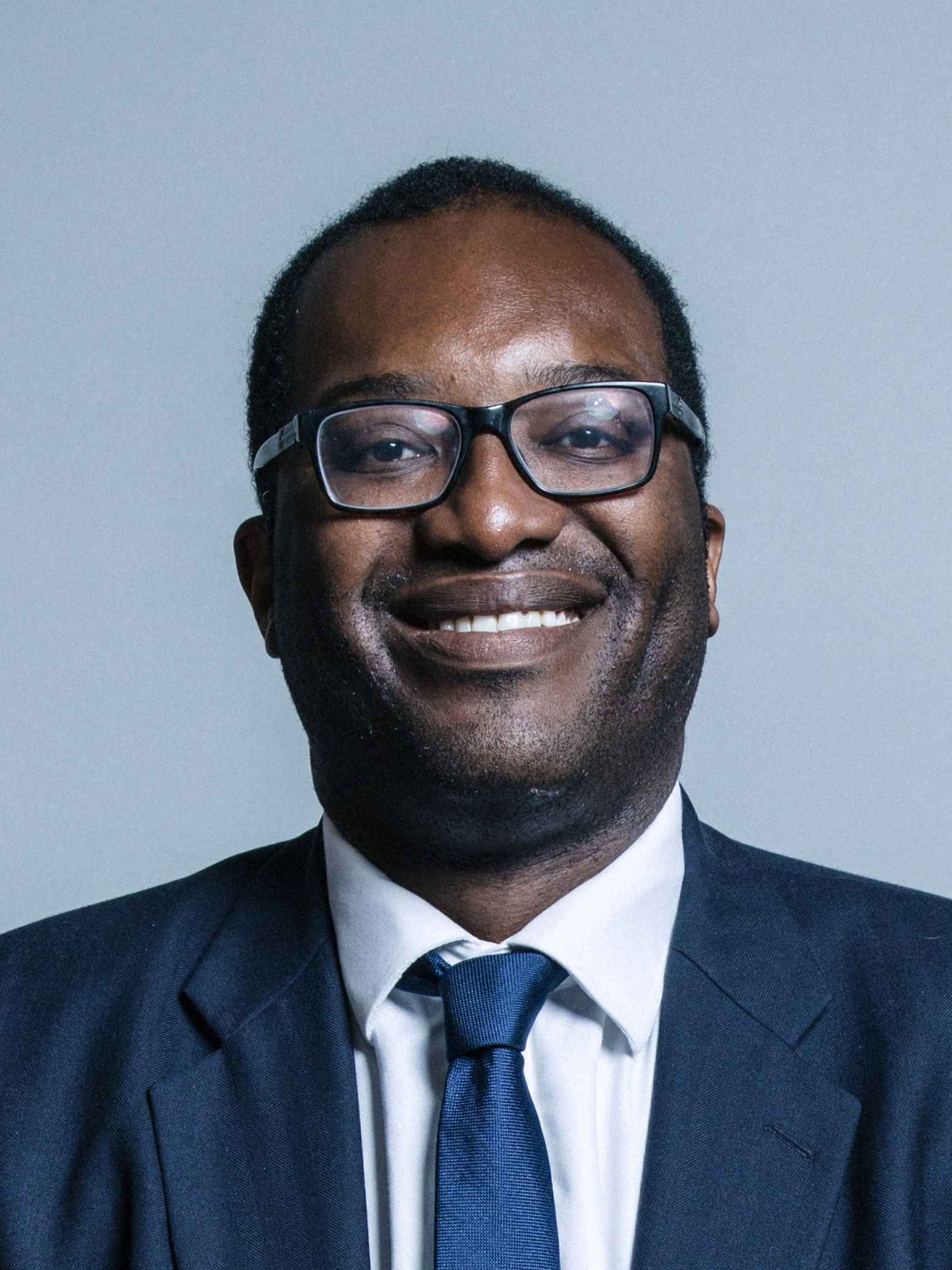
Kwasi Kwarteng (born 1975) is a British politician and author who lives in West Greenwich. He served as Chancellor of the Exchequer in 2022 and was previously Secretary of State for Business, Energy and Industrial Strategy and the Member of Parliament for Spelthorne from 2010 to 2024.

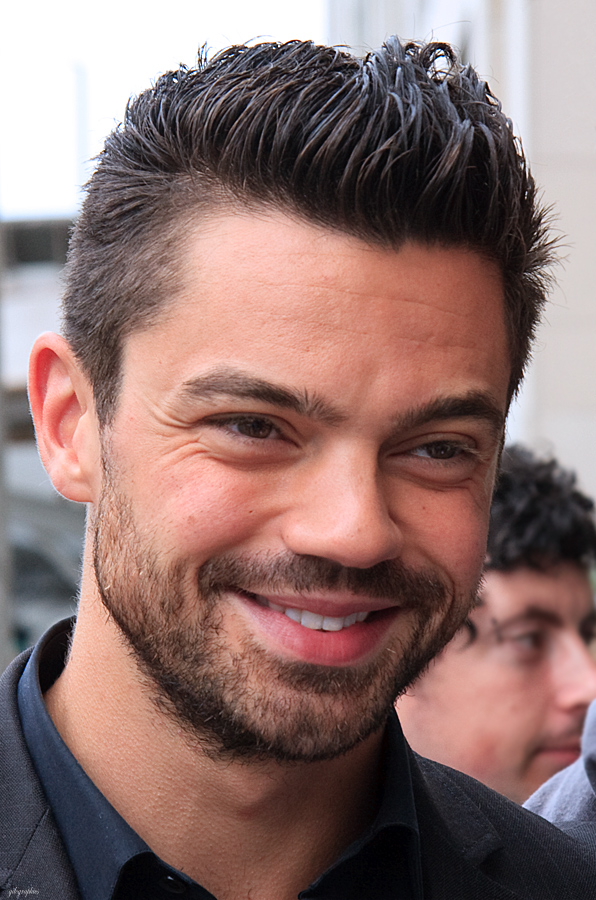
Dominic Cooper (born 1978) is an English actor, known for his performances in Mamma Mia! (2008) and Captain America: The First Avenger (2011). He was born and raised in Greenwich, where he attended local schools before training at the London Academy of Music and Dramatic Art.

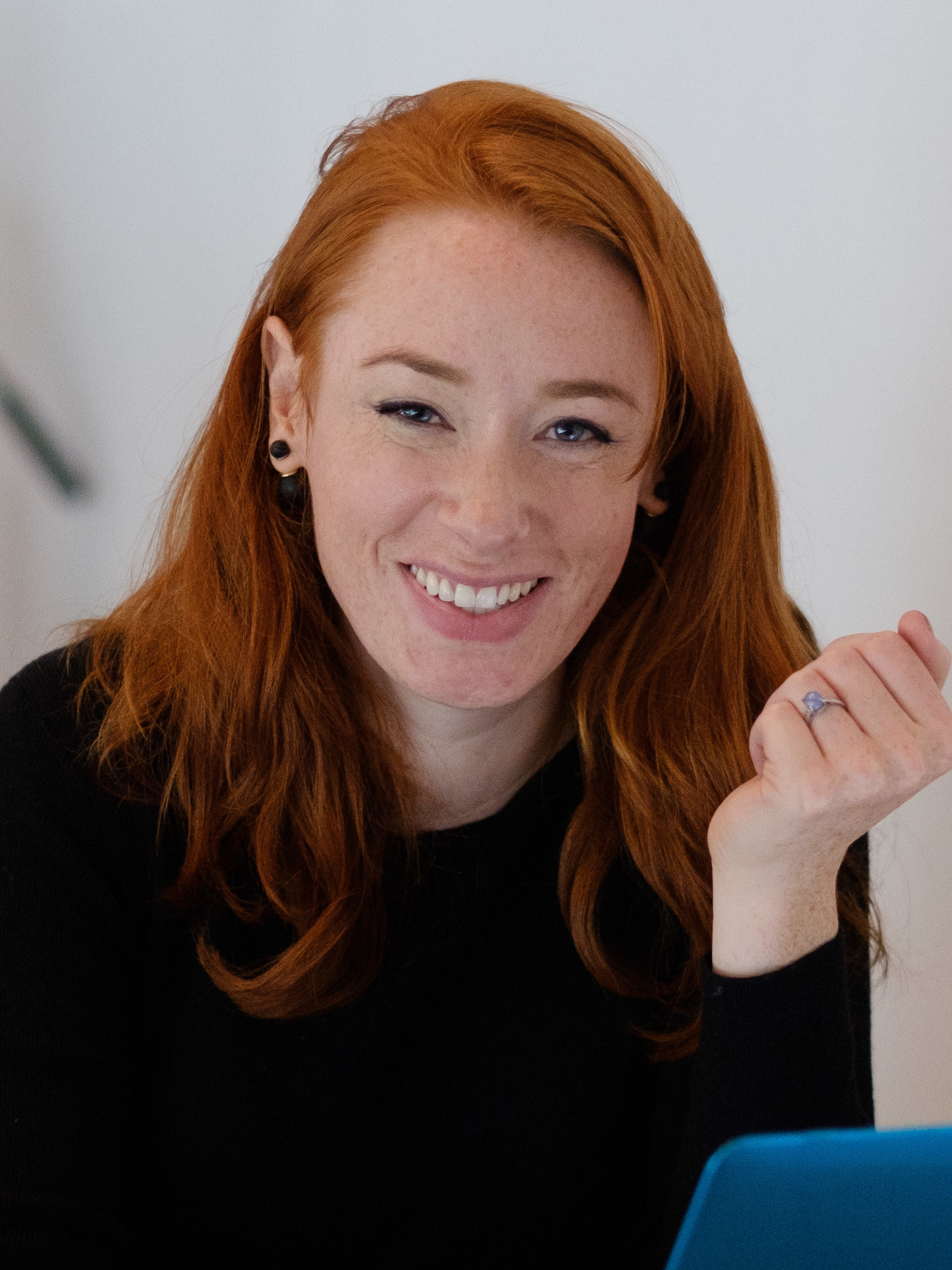
Hannah Fry (born 1984) is a British mathematician, author and broadcaster, better known for her popular science shows on the BBC. She is a resident of West Greenwich.

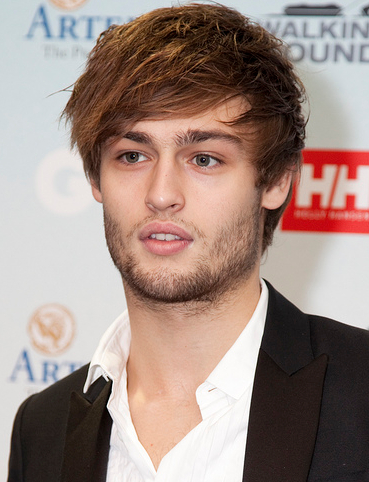
Douglas Booth (born 1992) is an English actor known for his roles in films such as Romeo and Juliet (2013) and Noah (2014). He was born and brought up in Greenwich before moving with his family to Sevenoaks, Kent, at the age of ten.

== See also ==
- Greenwich Cablevision
- List of people from Greenwich
- List of World Heritage Sites of the United Kingdom
