= Frederick Brearey =

British aeronautical inventor

Frederick William Brearey
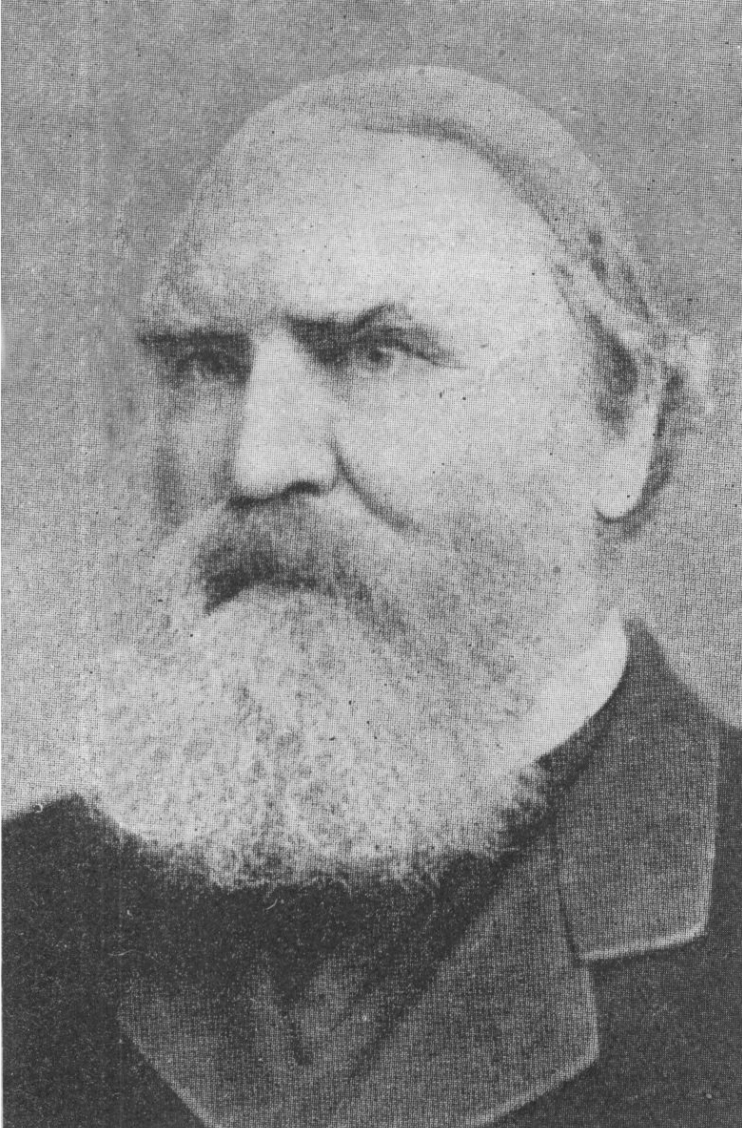
- Born: 18 February 1816; Stillingfleet, Yorkshire, England, United Kingdom
- Died: 31 January 1896 (aged 79); Cornhill, London, England, United Kingdom
- Citizenship: British
- Occupations: Co-Founder and Honorary Secretary of the Aeronautical Society of Great Britain
- Years active: 1866-1896
- Era: Victorian
- Known for: Aeronautics pioneer and inventor
- Spouse: Elizabeth Selby (m. 1846)
- Children: Frederick William (1854); Lily Lascelles (1858)
- Awards: Gold Medal, Société française de navigation aérienne (1875)

1st Honorary Secretary of the Royal Aeronautical Society
- In office 1866–1896
- Succeeded by: Baden Baden-Powell

Signature
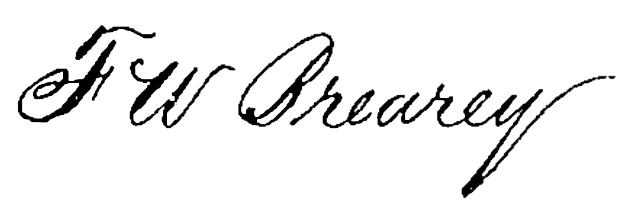

Frederick William Brearey (born on 18 February 1816 in Stillingfleet and died on 31 January 1896 in London) was a British aeronautical inventor and pioneer. He cofounded the Aeronautical Society of Great Britain in 1866, now the Royal Aeronautical Society, and served as its Honorary Secretary for thirty years until his death. He is widely regarded as one of the pioneers and founding figures of aeronautics and heavier-than-air flight.

Brearey played a key role in proposing and organizing the First Aeronautical Exhibition at The Crystal Palace, Sydehnam, London, in 1868. This exhibition brought together 77 entries, including models, plans, machinery, and aerial apparatus illustrating contemporary experiments and concepts in flight. Although many contributions were experimental, the event heightened public and scientific interest in aerial navigation.

Throughout his tenure with the Aeronautical Society, Brearey maintained correspondence with leading innovators of the era and helped foster international exchange on flight research. Archival letters show his engagement with other experimenters, including James Glaisher and John Stringfellow, among others.

Brearey made a "wave action" aeroplane model driven by a rubber band. It had rigid spars (elsewhere called "bowsprits") which beat up and down, trailing undulating wings of fabric behind them, whose action propelled the model forward with "limited success." He filed for patents on this craft in Britain in 1879 and later in the U.S.

Brearey published more than 15 articles about aeronautical subjects from 1866 to 1883.

The 1880 and 1885 patents, as well as Brearey's correspondences, identify his location at Maidenstone Hill in Greenwich in the Hundred of Blackheath, Kent.

== Life ==
=== Early life ===
Frederick William Brearey was born on 18 February 1816 at Stillingfleet, near Scarborough, Yorkshire in England. He was the fourth son of Henry Brearey, a barrister and coroner for the North Riding of Yorkshire. The Brearey family was well-regarded in the region, with Henry noted for his professional success and community impact, as reflected in contemporary obituaries. Henry was a friend of Sir George Cayley, the aristocratic scientist now regarded as the father of aeronautics. Members of Brearey's family witnessed Cayley’s early gliding experiments, and although Brearey later stated he had not been directly influenced by this as a child, Cayley's papers — published in Mechanics' Magazine — became a foundational source for his later work. From an early age Brearey was described as "a dreamer of aerial dreams," but he did not begin serious aeronautical experimentation until the mid-1860s.

By 1846, Brearey had moved to London and on 7 October of that year married Elizabeth Selby, a captain daughter, in Greenwich. In 1851, Brearey set up a private detective agency named The Institute for Discovery of Addresses based at 5 New Bridge Street in Blackfriars. However, the practice was unsuccessful and, in 1855, Brearey was declared bankrupt. Brearey survived on short-term jobs and appointments, often as secretary for various societies and associations. By that time, Breary and Selby had two children, Frederick William who was born in 1854, and Lily Lascelles who was born in 1858.

=== Aeronautical Society of Great Britain ===
By the 1860s, Brearey pivoted back to aeronautics, his childhood passion. By then, his address in official communications reflected as Maidenstone Hill in Greenwich. Brearey started to perform his first heavier-than-air flight experiments, and connected with the scientific community. Brearey contacted meteorologist James Glaisher, who lived only a few streets away on 20 Dartmouth Hill, and attended the 1865 British Association for the Advancement of Science meeting in Birmingham, where Brearey suggested founding an aeronautical society:

Now that public attention was directed to these scientific efforts, and that the balloon was becoming more than a toy, he [Brearey] would at once propose the formation of a society, to be supported by subscriptions and donations, by which experiments could be conducted in its own grounds, and with its own apparatus, for the furtherance of investigations in aërology locomotion.

— British Association for the Advancement of Science, 1865.

In 1866, Breary co-founded the Aeronautical Society of Great Britain along with James Glaisher, Francis Wenham and the Duke of Argyll. Brearey was appointed as its honorary secretary. Brearey's primary motivation was to shift aeronautics from sporadic ballooning feats toward systematic research on heavier-than-air flight, recognising the need for organised scientific inquiry to overcome the field's fragmented state. As a founding member, he helped define the society's early direction, emphasising mechanical navigation over lighter-than-air devices. His primary responsibilities included managing the society's meetings, correspondence, and archival records, all conducted from his home on Maidenstone Hill. Brearey organised council and general meetings, often reporting on administrative matters and guiding discussions among members to advance aeronautical knowledge. He maintained extensive correspondence with inventors, engineers, and international contacts, serving as a central hub for exchanging ideas and updates on aerial navigation. Additionally, he oversaw the compilation and publication of annual reports from 1866 to 1893, which documented member activities, submitted papers, and yearly progress, preserving the society's institutional memory with print runs of up to 1,000 copies.

The First Aeronautical Exhibition opened on 25 June 1868 at The Crystal Palace in Sydenham, London, and ran for the following ten days, attracting 77 entries from contemporary experimenters. Brearey coordinated the event's logistics, cataloguing exhibits into seven classes: light engines and machinery; complete working aerial apparatus; models; working models; plans and illustrative drawings; articles connected with aeronautics; and kites or similar devices. To emphasise experimental flight concepts, the exhibition included prises such as £50 from the Shipwrecked Mariners' Society for the best lifesaving kite and £100 from the Duke of Sutherland for a manned, non-balloon machine capable of ascending 120 feet—though the latter went unclaimed—along with an award for the lightest proportional engine, won by John Stringfellow's steam-driven triplane model. A special Jurors' Report documented the displays, providing critical evaluation of the submissions.

The exhibition had an immediate and notable impact, sparking heightened public curiosity in aerial navigation by shifting perceptions from ballooning spectacles to serious engineering pursuits, while stimulating scientific discourse on flight mechanics through demonstrations like flapping-wing experiments. It elevated aeronautics' status within scientific circles, paving the way for subsequent innovations, such as the first wind tunnel in 1871.

Brearey's letters and Society channels fostered international exchanges on flight research, positioning the organisation as a global clearing house for aeronautical knowledge from 1866 onward. He often corresponded with John Stringfellow. Archival records from the Society's collections document Brearey's role in coordinating such interactions, which extended to inventors like Frederick Marriott, the Society's first American member in 1871, who shared glider and airship concepts across the Atlantic. These efforts facilitated the exchange of patents, books, and experimental data, enhancing cross-border awareness of progress in ballooning and mechanical flight during the 1870s and 1880s. Through these networks, Brearey contributed to international collaboration by linking British experimenters with counterparts abroad, such as Otto Lilienthal in Germany and members of French aeronautical societies. In 1875, the Société d’Aviation in France awarded Brearey its Gold Medal in recognition of his efforts to disseminate aeronautical advancements globally, including reports on balloon observations tied to aerology studies and heavier-than-air trials.

=== Aeronautical research ===
In the late 1870s, Frederick Brearey developed an experimental model aeroplane based on what he termed the "wave action principle", representing one of his principal contributions to Victorian-era research into heavier-than-air flight. At a time when aeronautical inventors sought alternatives to balloons and conventional propellers, Brearey explored biomimetic propulsion inspired by the undulating motion of aquatic animals. His work aligned with broader debates within the Aeronautical Society of Great Britain, concerning the potential of flexible and non-flapping lifting surfaces.

Constructed around 1879, the wave action model was a small, lightweight demonstrator powered by a rubber-band motor. Its propulsion system employed rigid spars, or "bowsprits", driven to oscillate vertically, producing a travelling wave along attached fabric wings made of silk or similar material. Flexible lever arms extended from a slender, pointed fuselage, allowing vibrations to propagate rearward along the wings. This wave-like motion was intended to generate both lift and thrust by displacing air in a manner analogous to the movement of fish such as skates or rays, distinguishing the design from contemporary fixed-wing or propeller-driven models.

Experimental trials achieved only limited success. The model demonstrated brief forward motion and was publicly exhibited by Brearey in lectures, including demonstrations at the Greenwich Lecture Hall, where it was reported to have lifted a load of approximately three-quarters of a pound. However, the design suffered from poor stability and efficiency, highlighting the difficulties of translating biomimetic concepts into sustained, controlled flight. Despite these limitations, the wave action aeroplane contributed to contemporary discussions on flexible-wing and oscillatory propulsion systems.

Brearey sought legal protection for the design through British Patent No. 2376 in 1879, followed by U.S. Patent No. 234,947, filed in 1880 and granted later that year, with a partial interest assigned to John F. Mackenzie. He subsequently obtained a supplementary U.S. patent (No. 320,042), filed in 1883 and granted in 1885, which refined aspects of the original concept. These patents constitute Brearey's principal documented aeronautical innovations and reflect his sustained interest in undulating propulsion mechanisms during the formative period of powered flight research.

=== Later life and death ===
In later life, as the membership of the Society dwindled, Brearey experienced severe financial hardship; contemporary legal records identify him as a patentee of no occupation who was imprisoned for debt in the Debtors' Prison for London and Middlesex, having resided at 6 College Place, now Maidenstone Hill, in Greenwich.
