= Frederick Marriott =

Anglo-American publisher

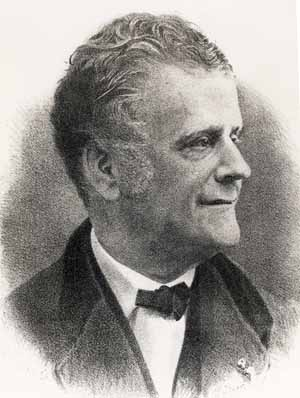
- c. 1873 after Bradley & Rulofson
- Born: 16 July 1805; Enfield, London, England
- Died: 16 December 1884 (aged 79); San Francisco, California, United States

Frederick Marriott (16 July 1805, Enfield, England – 16 December 1884, San Francisco, California) was an Anglo-American publisher and early promoter of aviation who created the Avitor Hermes Jr., the first unmanned aircraft to fly by its own power in the United States.

His early years were influenced by his father William Marriott, a law agent and editor of the Taunton Courier in Taunton, England. During his early 20s he was employed as a clerk in Bombay by the East India Company, returning to England in the early 1830s, where he married and accepted a position with the Bank of England.

The rapid expansion of the printing industry in Britain during the 1830s prompted Marriott to resign from the Bank of England and use a substantial portion of his wife's inheritance to fund a number of new publications. With the expanding readership of working class in England during the Industrial Revolution, the investments paid off; Marriott was involved in the creation of the Weekly Chronicle and popular Illustrated London News.

In 1845 Marriott began publishing a weekly publication Chat, however by 1849 the venture failed, nearly bankrupting him. This led ultimately to the dissolution of his marriage.

Rumours of gold in the American West prompted Marriott to pursue further adventure overseas; age 45 he sailed to California via the treacherous Isthmus of Panama and was nearly shipwrecked. Avoiding the temptation of the gold fields, Marriott became a banker in San Francisco. In 1856 he used his accumulated wealth to start a publication known as the Newsletter.

He was described by the publisher of the newspaper Northern Indianian, 19 March 1874 as "an English gentlemen, of eccentric habits, much shrewdness and enterprise, and entire originality".

Marriott is credited with inventing the term "aeroplane", and intended to build an air transport system that would bring people from New York to California without the perils of the normal voyage of the 19th century. The company he formed (with Andrew Smith Hallidie) in 1866 was named the Aerial Steam Navigation Company.

== Publisher ==
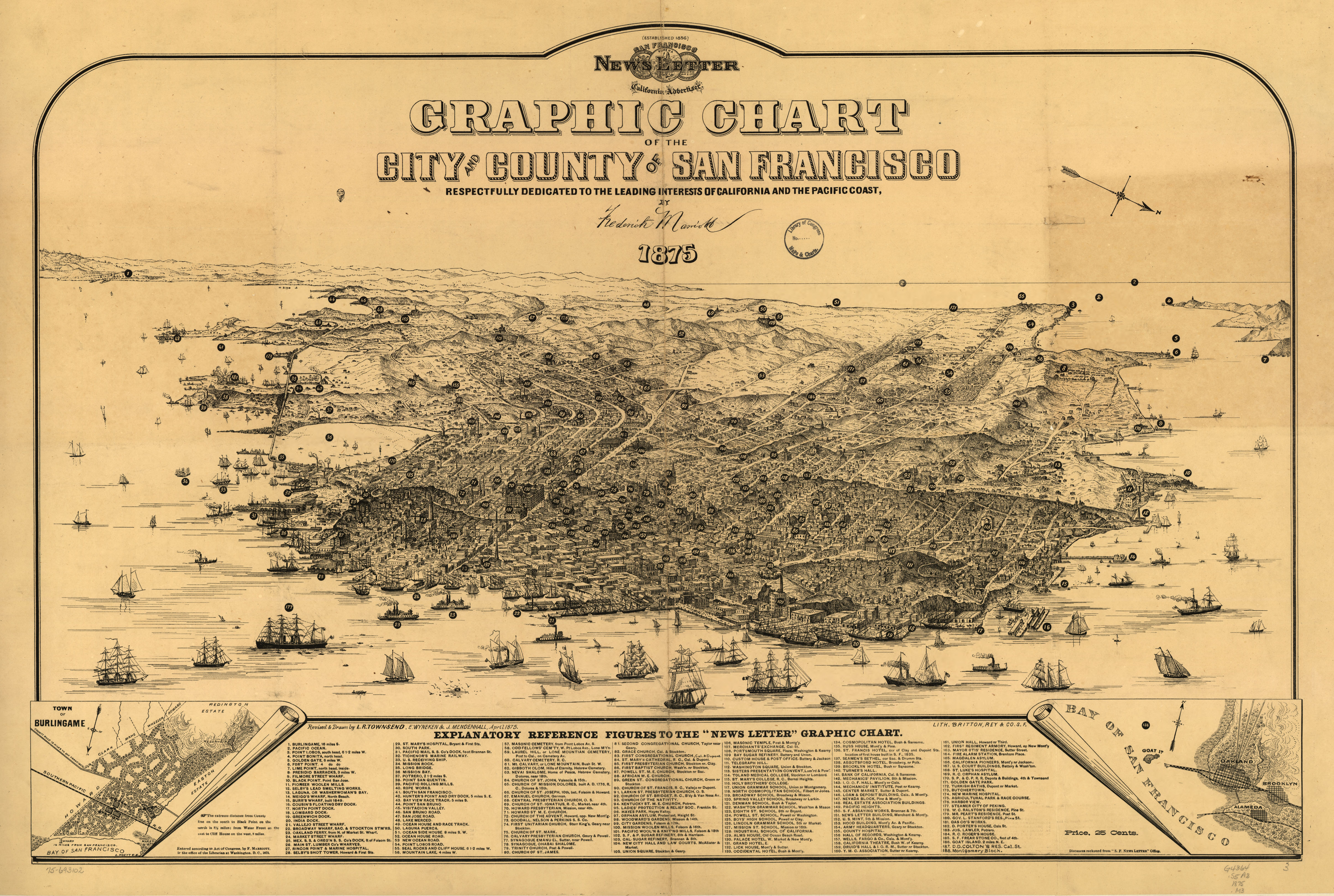
Graphic Chart of the City and County of San Francisco, revised and drawn by L.R. Townsend, E. Wyneken and J. Mendenhall, April 1875. Published by the San Francisco News Letter (by Frederick Marriott, publisher).

Marriott was a founder of The Illustrated London News. and credited as the publisher of the San Francisco News Letter and California Advertiser, subtitled "The Authorized Organ of the Aerial Steam Navigation Company". One of the lead columns of the News Letter was named "Town Crier", written by Major Ambrose Bierce.

The California China Mail and Flying Dragon was a Chinese-language publication and one of the first sources of advertisements encouraging Chinese emigrants to work on the Western railway. It was subtitled "Issued Every China Steamer Day."

The California News Notes was illustrated and many of the woodcuts, typically depicting the linkages of various railway lines, remain popular with collectors.

As a publisher, Marriott was one of the first to print works by Mark Twain and other distinguished writers Bret Harte, Frank Pixley, Ambrose Bierce and Daniel O’Connell.

== Avitor ==
In 1841 in London, England, Marriott was one of three board members of the Aerial Transit Company along with John Stringfellow and William Samuel Henson. Marriott was responsible for the illustrations and publicity campaign for their planned aerial steam carriage the Ariel. The aircraft captured the imagination of the public and the company constructed and flew a small glider, but after a failure to build a larger working model and lacking funds, the company failed. Henson married and relocated to the United States, while Stringfellow continued aeronautical experiments. Marriott moved to California during the Gold Rush of 1849.

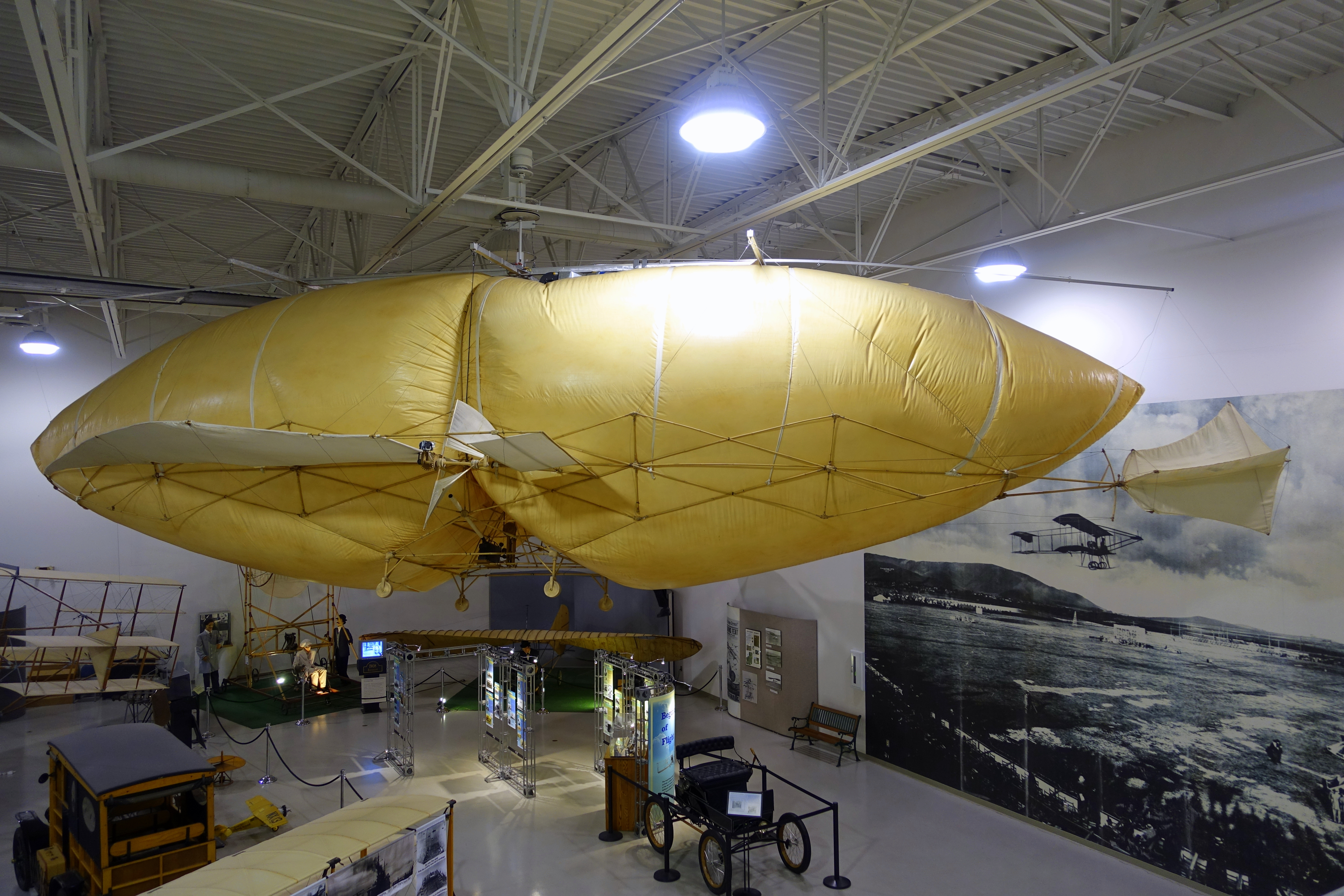
Avitor Hermes Jr. replica in the Hiller Aviation Museum

Avitor Hermes Jr. was a prototype unmanned aircraft built largely by candlelight in the basement of the publishing building Montgomery Block. The craft flew a few feet off the ground at Shell Mound Park racetrack, Millbrae during a short demonstration on 2 July 1869. (Note: Scientific American, 31 July 1869, p.75) After that, Avitor was moved to the San Francisco Mechanics' Institute Pavilion, the largest hall in the city and displayed with scheduled flights four times per day. Many thousands visited for an admission fee before the aircraft caught fire after its first season. (Note: Marion and Marvin Martin (April 1935), "First to Fly in California", Westways, 27 (4): 23, 3) (Note: John Roberts Bruce (1948), Gaudy Century p. 120)

The 1869 stock market crash stymied Marriott's efforts to fly a lighter-than-air craft, although he did continue to work on a heavier-than-air triplane all the way until his death. John Joseph Montgomery was inspired by these experiments. Two years before Marriott's death, in 1882, the Aerial Steam Navigation Company was refinanced, and Augustus Laver, architect of The James C. Flood Mansion and The Ellen Kenna House, was named Consulting Engineer of the company.

Frederick Marriott died in San Francisco on 16 December 1884.

== Publications ==
- The Morning Chronicle
- The Illustrated London News
- Chat
- 1856–1928 San Francisco News Letter and California Advertiser
- Pacific Coast Mining Journal
- 1867–1876 California China Mail and Flying Dragon
- 1854–1855 California Mail Bag
- California News Notes
- Motoring Magazine and Motor Life

== See also ==
- John C. Frémont
- Emperor Norton
- William Henry Rhodes
- Zachariah Montgomery
- William Chapman Ralston

== Sources ==
- Drury, William, Norton I, Emperor of the United States (Dodd, Mead, & Company, 1986)
- Evans, Charles Morgan, Steam-Powered Pioneer, (Aviation, May 1993)
- Harwood, Craig S. and Fogel, Gary B. Quest for Flight: John J. Montgomery and the Dawn of Aviation in the West, (University of Oklahoma Press 2012)
- Johnson, Kenneth M., Aerial California. An Account of early Flight in Northern and Southern California, 1849 to World War I (Dawson's Book Shop, 1961)
- Parramore, Thomas C., First to Fly: North Carolina and the Beginnings of Aviation (University of North Carolina Press, 2002) ISBN 0-8078-2676-6
