= Aerial steam carriage =

Flying machine

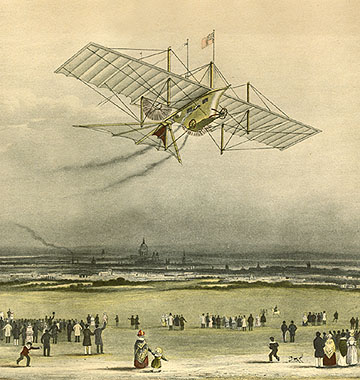
The Henson Aerial Steam Carriage of 1843 (imaginary representation for an advertisement).

The aerial steam carriage, also named Ariel, was a flying machine patented in England in 1842 that was supposed to carry passengers into the air. It was, in practice, incapable of flight since it had insufficient power from its heavy steam engine to fly. A more successful model was built in 1848 which was able to fly for small distances within a hangar. The aerial steam carriage was significant because it was a transition from glider experimentation to powered flight experimentation.

== Specifications ==
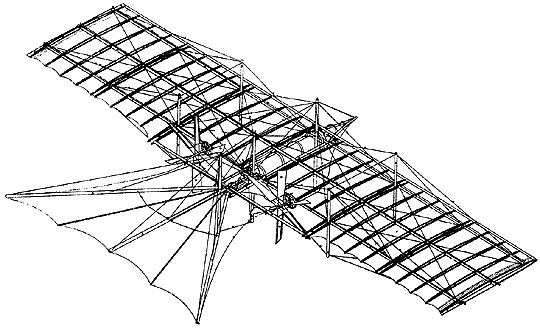
Patent drawing for the Henson Aerial Steam Carriage of 1843.

The Ariel was to be a monoplane with a wing span of 150 feet (46 m), weigh 3,000 lb (1,400 kg) and was to be powered by a specially designed lightweight steam-powered engine producing 50 hp (37 kW). The wing area was to be 4,500 sq ft (420 m^{2})., with the tail another 1500, yielding a very low wing loading. The inventors hoped that the Ariel would achieve a speed of 50 mph, and carry 10–12 passengers up to 1,000 miles (1,600 km). The plan was to launch it from an inclined ramp. The undercarriage was a 3-wheel design.

== British patent 9478 ==
William Samuel Henson (1812–1888) and John Stringfellow (1799–1883) received British patent 9478 in 1842.

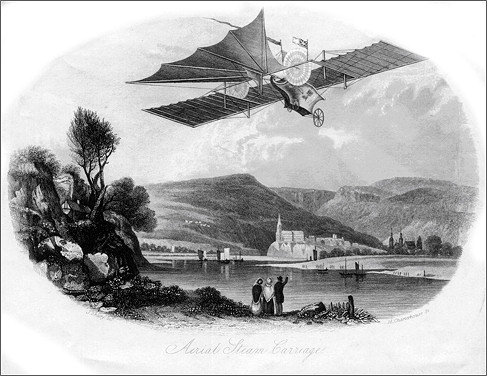

== Aerial Transit Company ==
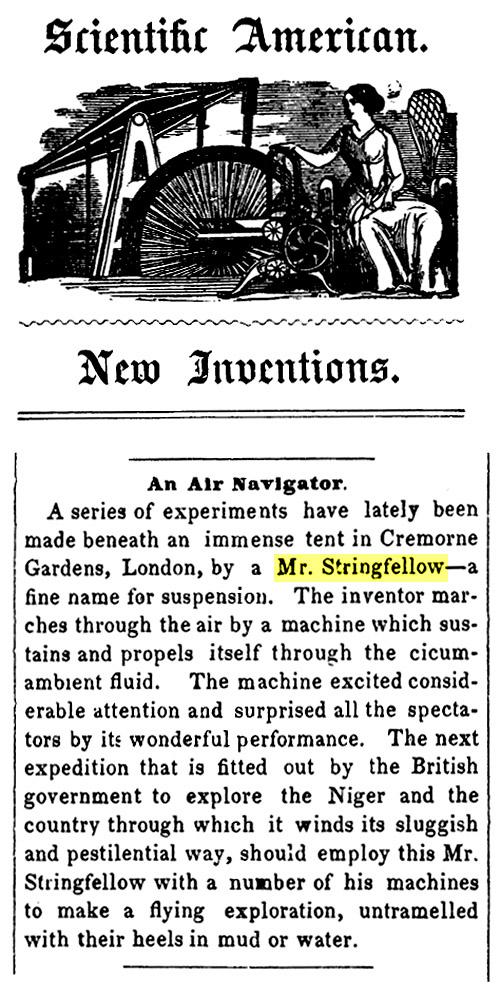
Scientific American, 23 September 1848 describing the aircraft's display at Cremorne Gardens, London.

William Samuel Henson, John Stringfellow, Frederick Marriott, and D.E. Colombine, incorporated as the "Aerial Transit Company" in 1843 in England, with the intention of raising money to construct the flying machine. Henson built a scale model of his design, which made one tentative steam-powered "hop" as it lifted or bounced, off its guide wire. Attempts were made to fly the small model, and a larger model with a 20-foot (6.1 m) wing span, between 1844 and 1847, without success.

The company planned "to convey letters, goods and passengers from place to place through the air", according to the patent.

In an attempt to gain investors and support in Parliament, the company engaged in a major publicity campaign using images of the Ariel in exotic locales, but the company failed to gain the needed investment. There was speculation in the press about whether the Ariel was a hoax or fraud.

== Ariel depictions and references ==
- The Ariel appears on a number of stamps from different countries, usually as part of aviation history series.
- London Airport's (later Heathrow) first purpose-built hotel was named ‘The Ariel’ in honour of Henson and Stringfellow's design (spellings vary). As a March 1962 brochure explained “In a sense [Henson and Stringfellow’s] ‘Ariel’ is an ancestor of the great airliners ... [and today] the name ‘Ariel’ is once more important in the world of flying. The Ariel Hotel, the first circular hotel in Europe, stands beside London Airport.”. The hotel featured a print of the Aerial Steam Carriage over its mantel.

== See also ==
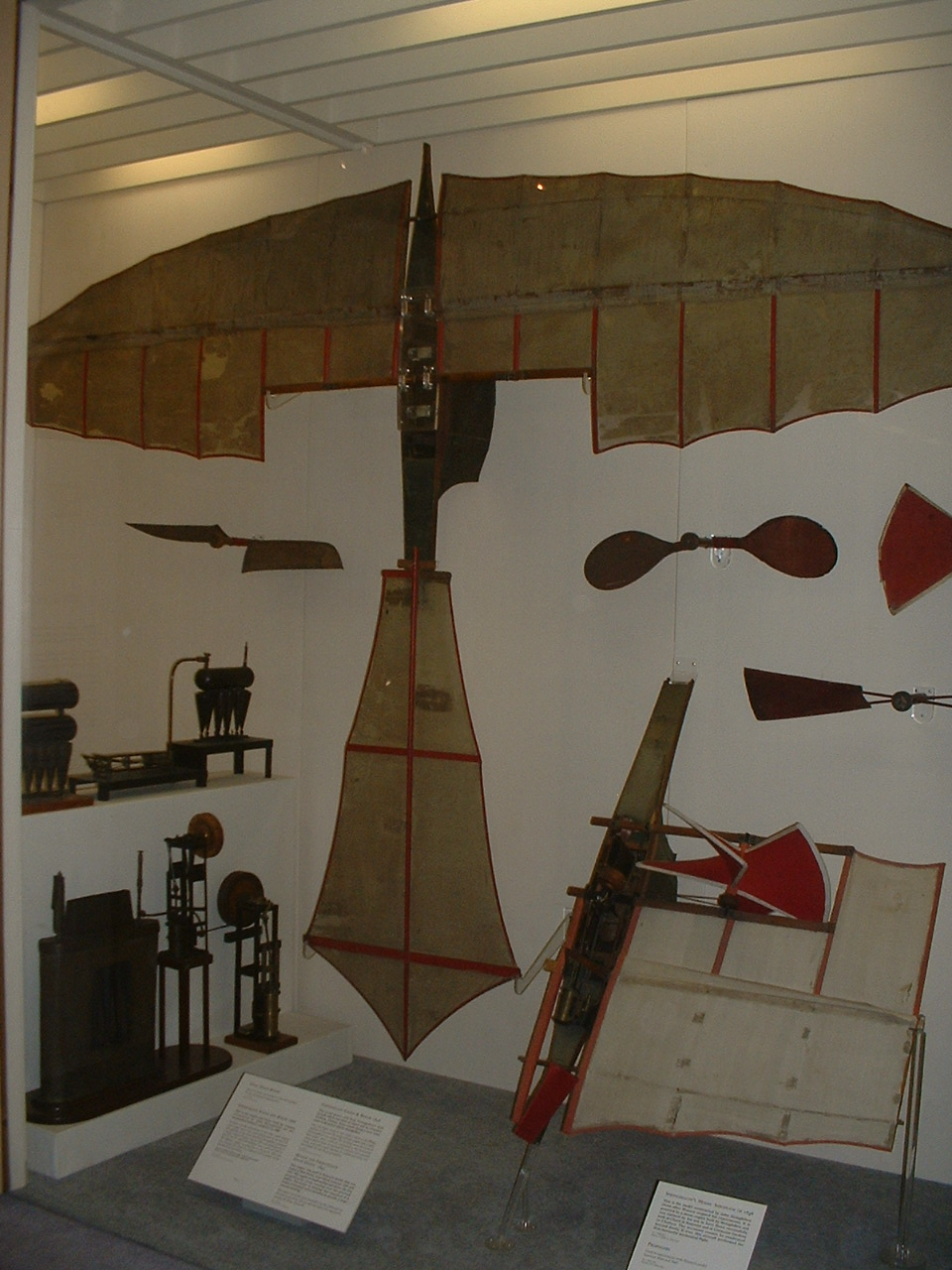
John Stringfellow's flying machine in the Science Museum, London.

- Chard Museum
- Early flying machines
- History of aviation
- Timeline of aviation
- Timeline of aviation – 19th century
- John Chapman, engineer.
- John Farey Jr., consultant engineer - recommended Richard Houchin of City Road, London to build a two-cylinder steam engine and boiler for the full-size Aerial Steam Carriage, Ariel.
