= Daniel O'Connell (disambiguation) =

Daniel O'Connell (1775–1847) was an Irish nationalist leader.

Daniel O'Connell may also refer to:

- Daniel O'Connell (journalist) (1849–1899), San Francisco literary figure, grand nephew of Daniel O'Connell of Ireland
- Daniel P. O'Connell (1885–1977), American politician
- Daniel O'Connell Jnr (1816–1897), Member of Parliament, son of Daniel O'Connell of Ireland
- Daniel Charles O'Connell (1745–1833), Irish army officer and uncle of Daniel O'Connell
- Daniel Joseph Kelly O'Connell (1896-1982), Irish astronomer and Jesuit priest
- D. P. O'Connell (Daniel Patrick O'Connell; 1924–1979), barrister and academic specializing in international law
- Danny O'Connell (1927–1969), baseball player
- Dan O'Connell (hurler) (born 1968) , Irish hurler
- Dan O'Connell (director) (born 1950s), pornographic film director
