= Aeronautics =

Science of air flight-capable machines

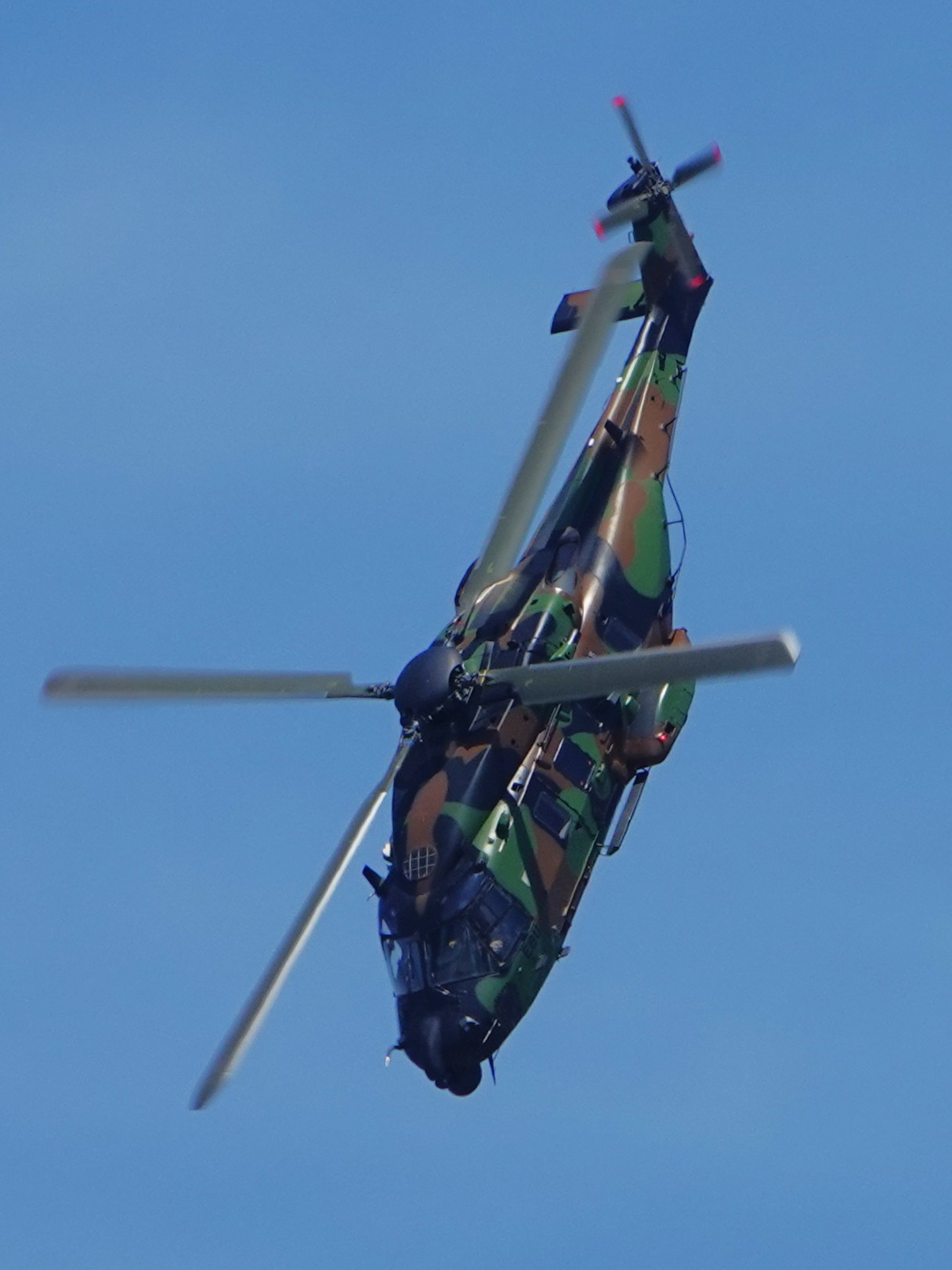
NH90 TTH Caïman (EBU) at the Paris Air Show - Le Bourget 2025

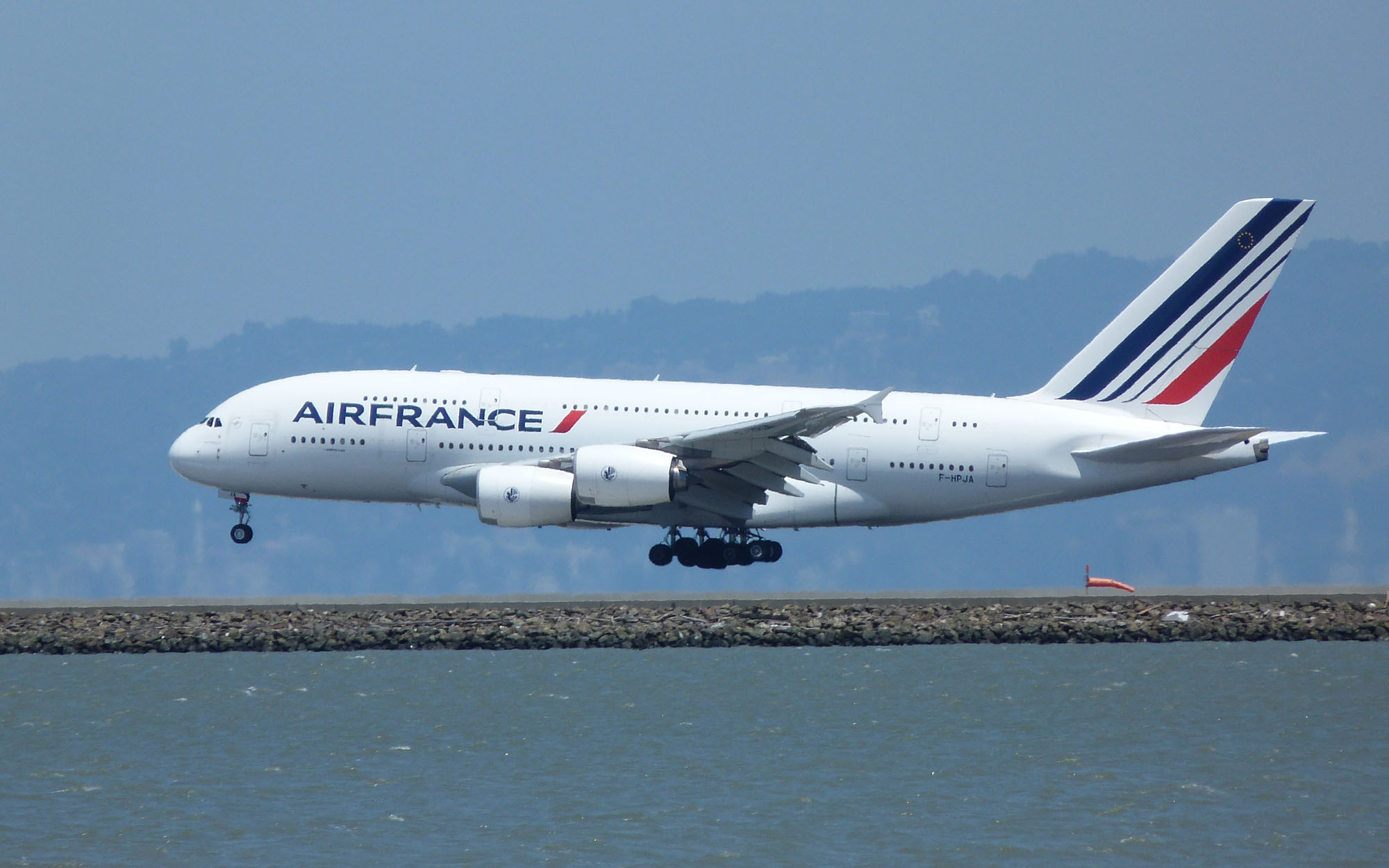
Air France, Airbus A380-861, F-HPJA

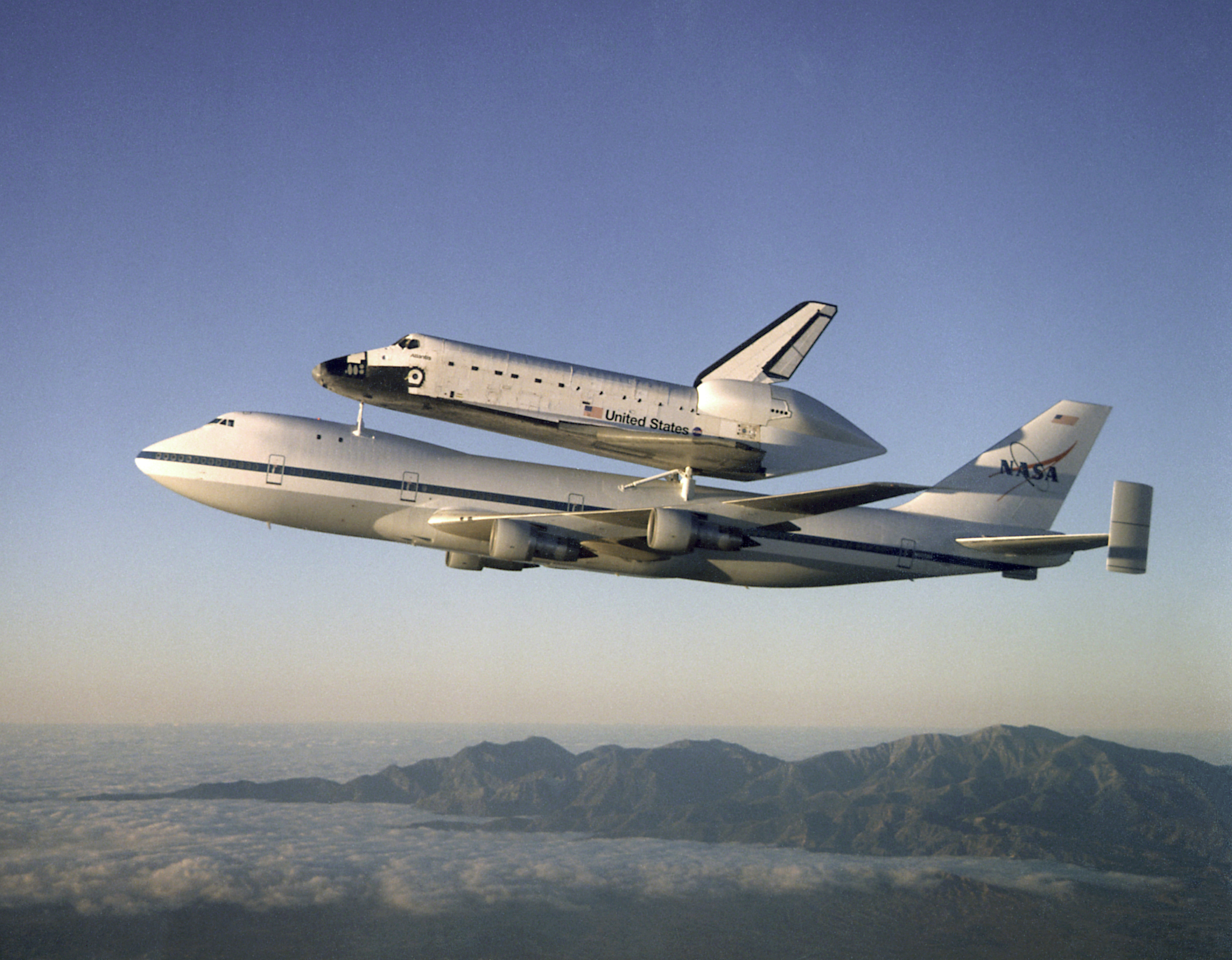
Space Shuttle Atlantis on a Shuttle Carrier Aircraft

Aeronautics is the science or art involved with the study, design, and manufacturing of air flight-capable machines, and the techniques of operating aircraft and rockets within the atmosphere. While the term originally referred solely to operating the aircraft, it has since been expanded to include technology, business, and other aspects related to aircraft. The term "aviation" is sometimes used interchangeably with aeronautics, although "aeronautics" includes lighter-than-air craft such as airships, and includes ballistic vehicles while "aviation" technically does not.

A significant part of aeronautical science is a branch of dynamics called aerodynamics, which deals with the motion of air and the way that it interacts with objects in motion, such as an aircraft.

== History ==
=== Early ideas ===
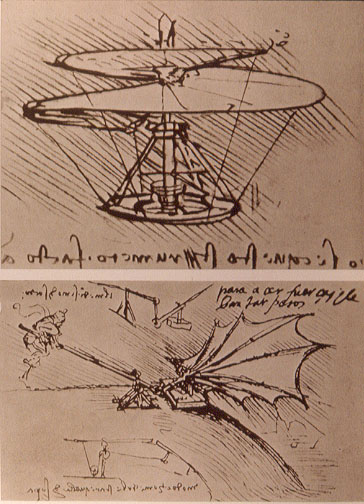
Designs for flying machines by Leonardo da Vinci, c. 1490

Attempts to fly without any real aeronautical understanding have been made from the earliest times, typically by constructing wings and jumping from a tower with crippling or lethal results.

Wiser investigators sought to gain some rational understanding through the study of bird flight. Medieval Islamic Golden Age scientists such as Abbas ibn Firnas also made such studies. The founders of modern aeronautics, Leonardo da Vinci in the Renaissance and Cayley in 1799, both began their investigations with studies of bird flight.

Man-carrying kites are believed to have been used extensively in ancient China. In 1282, the Italian explorer Marco Polo described the Chinese techniques then current. The Chinese also constructed small hot air balloons, or lanterns, and rotary-wing toys.

An early European to provide any scientific discussion of flight was Roger Bacon, who described principles of operation for the lighter-than-air balloon and the flapping-wing ornithopter, which he envisaged would be constructed in the future. The lifting medium for his balloon would be an "aether" whose composition he did not know.

In the late fifteenth century, Leonardo da Vinci followed up his study of birds with designs for some of the earliest flying machines, including the flapping-wing ornithopter and the rotating-wing helicopter. Although his designs were rational, they were not based on particularly good science. Many of his designs, such as a four-person screw-type helicopter, have severe flaws. He did at least understand that "An object offers as much resistance to the air as the air does to the object." (Newton would not publish the Third law of motion until 1687.) His analysis led to the realisation that manpower alone was not sufficient for sustained flight, and his later designs included a mechanical power source such as a spring. Da Vinci's work was lost after his death and did not reappear until it had been overtaken by the work of George Cayley.

=== Balloon flight ===
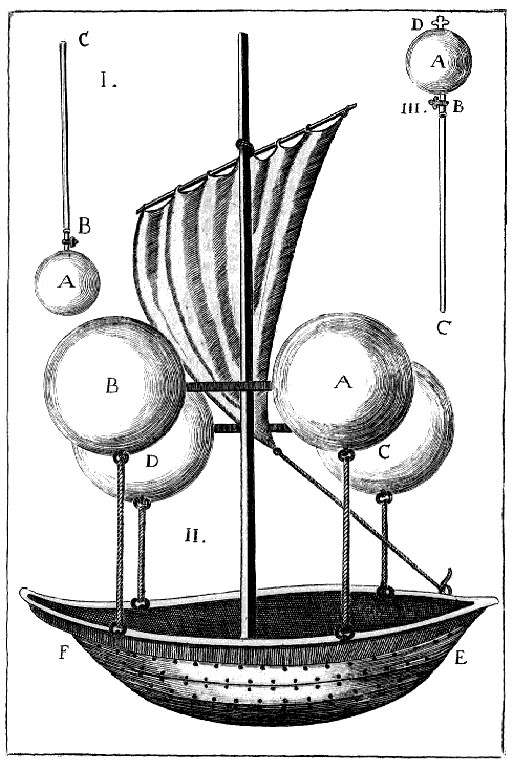
Francesco Lana de Terzi's flying boat concept c. 1670

The modern era of lighter-than-air flight began early in the 17th century with Galileo's experiments in which he showed that air has weight. Around 1650, Cyrano de Bergerac wrote fantasy novels in which he described the principle of ascent using a substance (dew) he believed was lighter than air, and descent by releasing a controlled amount of the substance. Francesco Lana de Terzi measured the pressure of air at sea level and in 1670 proposed the first scientifically credible lifting medium in the form of hollow metal spheres from which all the air had been pumped out. These would be lighter than the displaced air and able to lift an airship. His proposed methods of controlling height are still in use today: by carrying ballast which may be dropped overboard to gain height, and by venting the lifting containers to lose height. In practice, de Terzi's spheres would have collapsed under air pressure, and further developments had to wait for more practicable lifting gases.

From the mid-18th century, the Montgolfier brothers in France began experimenting with balloons. Their balloons were made of paper, and early experiments using steam as the lifting gas were short-lived because it affected the paper as it condensed. Mistaking smoke for a kind of steam, they began filling their balloons with hot smoky air, which they called "electric smoke" and, despite not fully understanding the principles at work, made some successful launches and in 1783 were invited to give a demonstration to the French Académie des Sciences.

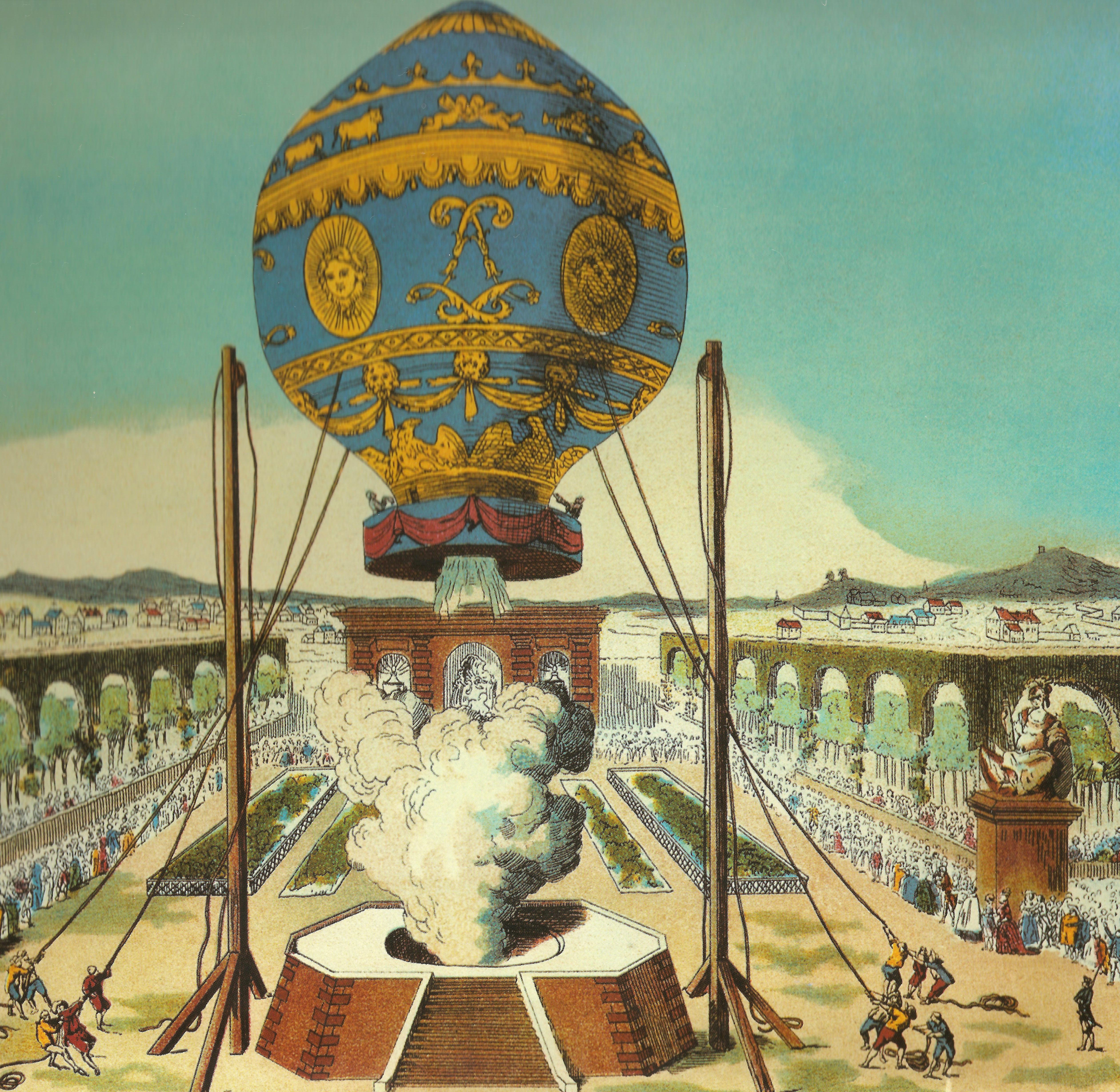
Montgolfier brothers flight, 1784

Meanwhile, the discovery of hydrogen led Joseph Black in c. 1780 to propose its use as a lifting gas, though practical demonstration awaited a gas-tight balloon material. On hearing of the Montgolfier Brothers' invitation, the French Academy member Jacques Charles offered a similar demonstration of a hydrogen balloon. Charles and two craftsmen, the Robert brothers, developed a gas-tight envelope from rubberised silk. The hydrogen gas was to be generated by chemical reaction during the filling process.

The Montgolfier designs had several shortcomings, not least the need for dry weather and a tendency for sparks from the fire to set the paper balloon alight. The manned design had a gallery around the base of the balloon rather than the hanging basket of the first, unmanned design, which brought the paper closer to the fire. On their free flight, De Rozier and d'Arlandes took buckets of water and sponges to douse these fires as they arose. In contrast, Charles's manned design was essentially modern. As a result of these exploits, the hot air balloon became known as the Montgolfière type and the gas balloon the Charlière.

Charles and the Robert brothers' next balloon, La Caroline, was a Charlière that followed Jean Baptiste Meusnier's proposals for an elongated dirigible balloon, and was notable for having an outer envelope with the gas contained in a second, inner ballonet. On 19 September 1784, it completed the first flight of over 100 kilometres (62 mi), between Paris and Beuvry, despite the man-powered propulsive devices proving useless.

In an attempt the next year to provide both endurance and controllability, de Rozier developed a balloon having both hot air and hydrogen gas bags, a design which was soon named after him as the Rozière. The principle was to use the hydrogen section for constant lift and to navigate vertically by heating and allowing to cool the hot air section, in order to catch the most favourable wind at whatever altitude it was blowing. The balloon envelope was made of goldbeater's skin. The first flight ended in disaster, and the approach has seldom been used since.

=== Cayley and the foundation of modern aeronautics ===
Sir George Cayley (1773–1857) is widely acknowledged as the founder of modern aeronautics. He was first called the "father of the aeroplane" in 1846 and Henson called him the "father of aerial navigation." He was the first true scientific aerial investigator to publish his work, which included for the first time the underlying principles and forces of flight.

In 1809 he began the publication of a landmark three-part treatise titled "On Aerial Navigation" (1809–1810). In it he wrote the first scientific statement of the problem, "The whole problem is confined within these limits, viz. to make a surface support a given weight by the application of power to the resistance of air." He identified the four vector forces that influence an aircraft: thrust, lift, drag and weight and distinguished stability and control in his designs.

He developed the modern conventional form of the fixed-wing aeroplane having a stabilising tail with both horizontal and vertical surfaces, flying gliders both unmanned and manned.

He introduced the use of the whirling arm test rig to investigate the aerodynamics of flight, using it to discover the benefits of the curved or cambered aerofoil over the flat wing he had used for his first glider. He also identified and described the importance of dihedral, diagonal bracing and drag reduction, and contributed to the understanding and design of ornithopters and parachutes.

Another significant invention was the tension-spoked wheel, which he devised in order to create a light, strong wheel for aircraft undercarriage.

=== The 19th century: Otto Lilienthal and the first human flights ===
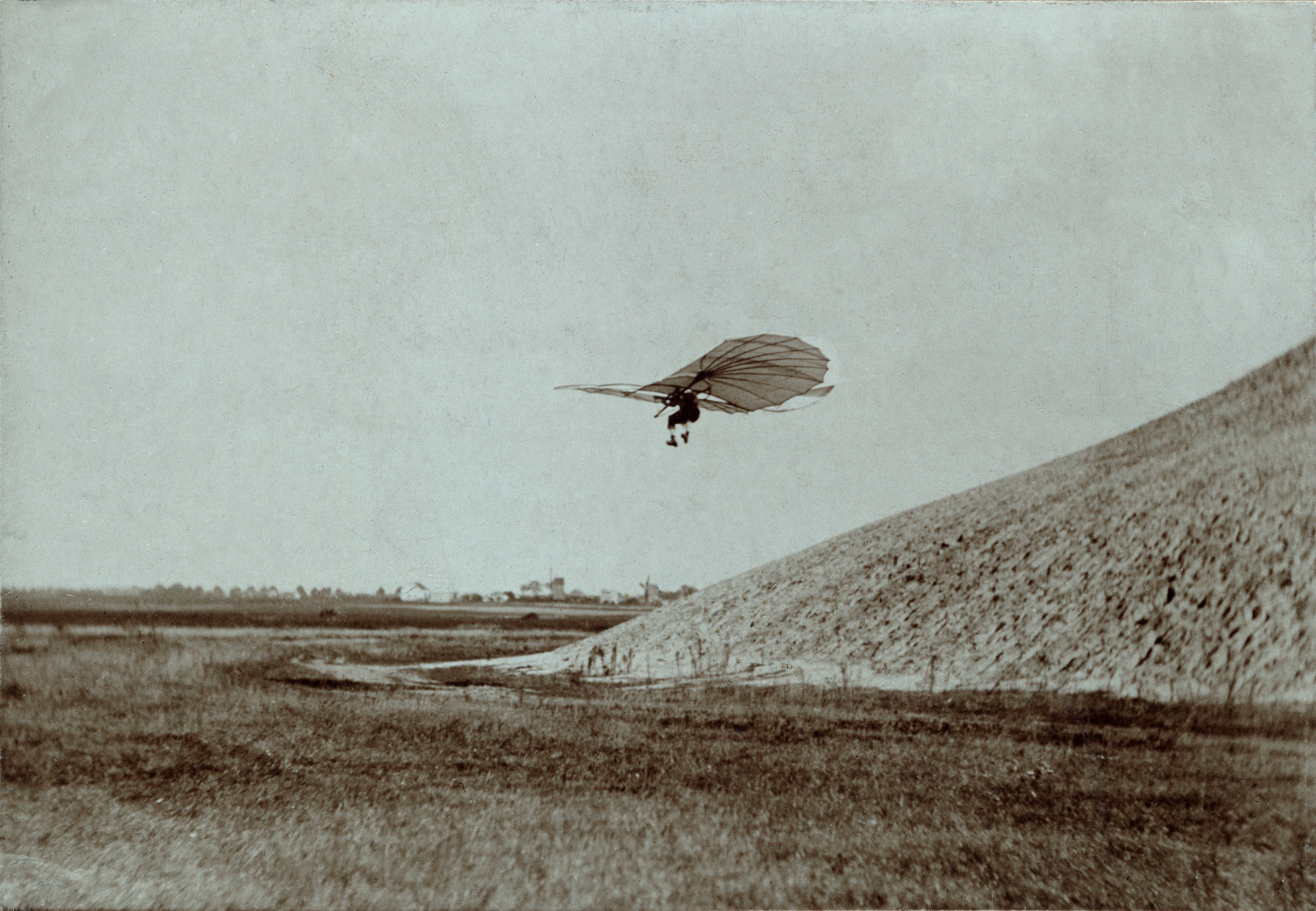
Lilienthal in mid-flight, Berlin c. 1895

During the 19th century, Cayley's ideas were further developed, tested, and formalised. Public and scientific interest in aeronautics grew during the Victorian era, with notable contributions from figures such as John Stringfellow, James Glaisher, Francis Wenham, and Frederick Brearey. Wenham, Glaisher, and Brearey co-founded the Aeronautical Society of Great Britain in 1866, together with the 8th Duke of Argyll. Although aeronautical research at the time remained largely experimental, the Society played an important role in promoting heavier-than-air flight, including through the First Aeronautical Exhibition held in 1868 at The Crystal Palace.

These developments, along with growing international interest, helped lay the groundwork for the later work of Horatio Phillips among others, but more importantly of Otto Lilienthal, a German engineer and businessman who became known as the "flying man". He was the first person to make well-documented, repeated, successful flights with gliders, therefore making the idea of "heavier than air" a reality. Newspapers and magazines published photographs of Lilienthal gliding, favourably influencing public and scientific opinion about the possibility of flying machines becoming practical.

His work led to the development of the modern wing. His flight attempts in Berlin in the year 1891 are seen as the beginning of human flight and the "Lilienthal Normalsegelapparat" is considered to be the first air plane in series production, making the Maschinenfabrik Otto Lilienthal in Berlin the first air plane production company in the world. Otto Lilienthal is often referred to as either the "father of aviation" or "father of flight".

== Branches ==
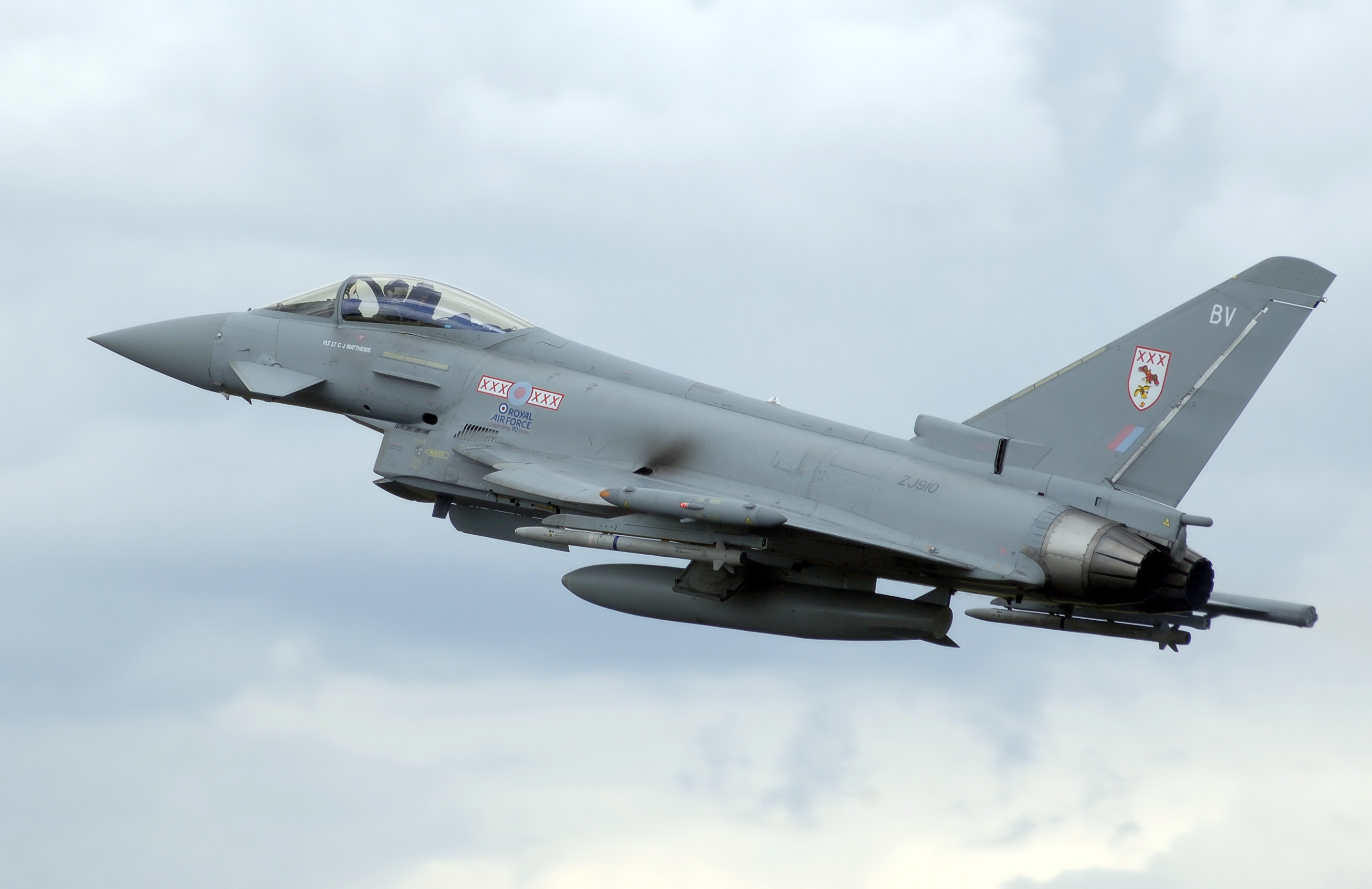
The Eurofighter Typhoon

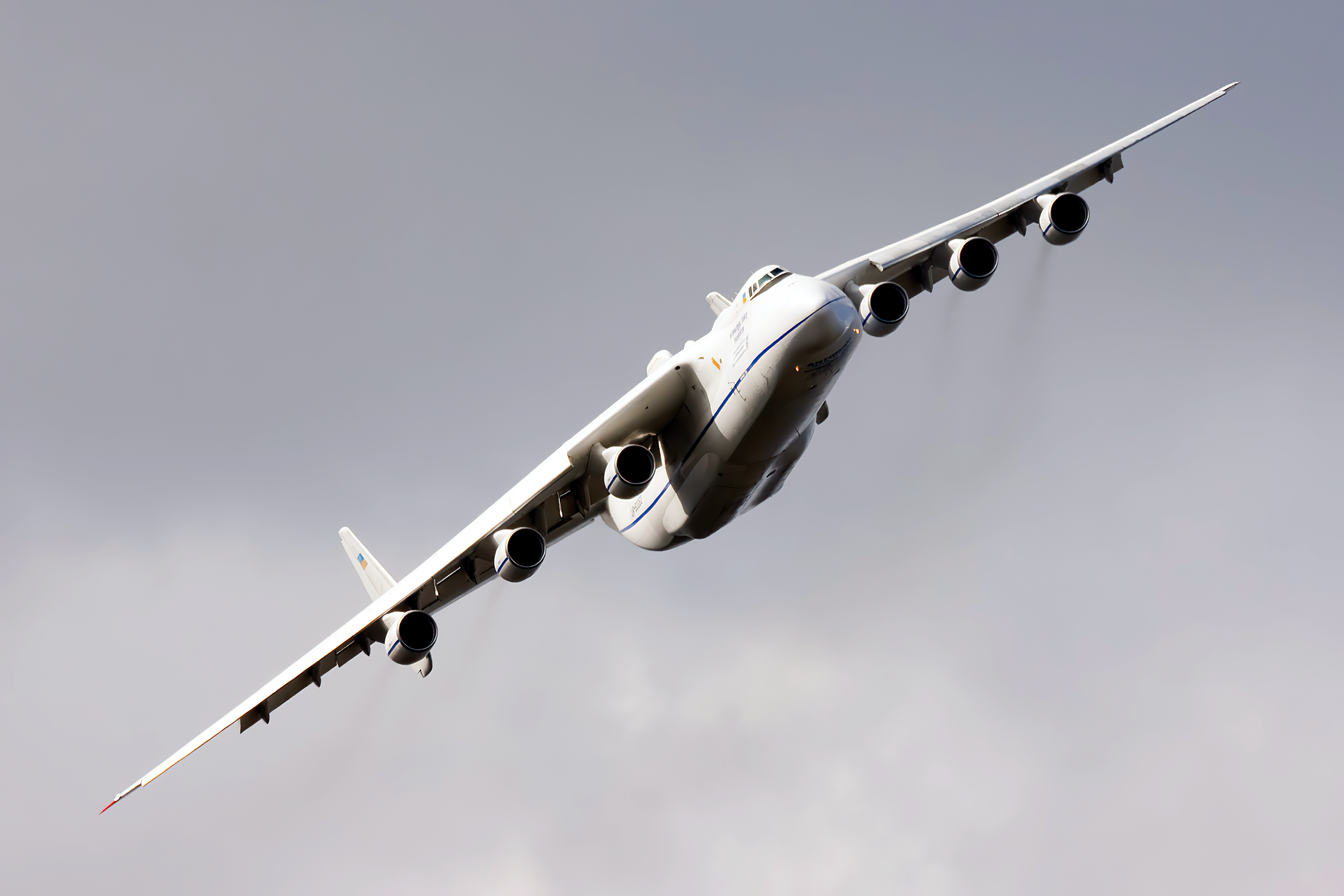
Antonov An-225 Mriya, the largest aeroplane ever built

Aeronautics may be divided into three main branches, Aviation, Aeronautical science and Aeronautical engineering.

=== Aviation ===
Aviation is the art or practice of aeronautics. Historically aviation meant only heavier-than-air flight, but nowadays it includes flying in balloons and airships.

=== Aeronautical engineering ===
Aeronautical engineering covers the design and construction of aircraft, including how they are powered, how they are used and how they are controlled for safe operation.

A major part of aeronautical engineering is aerodynamics, the science of passing through the air.

With the increasing activity in space flight, nowadays aeronautics and astronautics are often combined as aerospace engineering.

==== Aerodynamics ====
The science of aerodynamics deals with the motion of air and the way that it interacts with objects in motion, such as an aircraft.

The study of aerodynamics falls broadly into three areas:

Incompressible flow occurs where the air simply moves to avoid objects, typically at subsonic speeds below that of sound (Mach 1).

Compressible flow occurs where shock waves appear at points where the air becomes compressed, typically at speeds above Mach 1.

Transonic flow occurs in the intermediate speed range around Mach 1, where the airflow over an object may be locally subsonic at one point and locally supersonic at another.

=== Rocketry ===
Launch of Apollo 15 Saturn V rocket: T – 30 s through T + 40 s.

A rocket or rocket vehicle is a missile, spacecraft, aircraft or other vehicle which obtains thrust from a rocket engine. In all rockets, the exhaust is formed entirely from propellants carried within the rocket before use. Rocket engines work by action and reaction. Rocket engines push rockets forwards simply by throwing their exhaust backwards extremely fast.

Rockets for military and recreational uses date back to at least 13th-century China. Significant scientific, interplanetary and industrial use did not occur until the 20th century, when rocketry was the enabling technology of the Space Age, including setting foot on the Moon.

Rockets are used for fireworks, weaponry, ejection seats, launch vehicles for artificial satellites, human spaceflight and exploration of other planets. While comparatively inefficient for low speed use, they are very lightweight and powerful, capable of generating large accelerations and of attaining extremely high speeds with reasonable efficiency.

Chemical rockets are the most common type of rocket and they typically create their exhaust by the combustion of rocket propellant. Chemical rockets store a large amount of energy in an easily released form, and can be very dangerous. However, careful design, testing, construction and use minimizes risks.

== See also ==
- Aeronautical abbreviations
- Aeronautics Defense Systems
- Aerospace engineering
- Aerostatics
- Air safety
- Aircraft design process
- Aircraft flight control system
- Aircraft flight mechanics
- American Institute of Aeronautics and Astronautics
- Astronautics
- Aviation, aerospace, and aeronautical terms
- Avionics
- Flight dynamics
- Index of aviation articles
- Longitudinal static stability
- The Royal Aeronautical Society
