= John Chapman (engineer) =

English engineer and writer (1801–1854)

John Chapman (20 January 1801 – 11 September 1854) was an English engineer and writer. At different times in his career, he was involved with lace-making machinery, journalism, Hansom cabs and the promotion of railways, cotton and irrigation in India.

== Life ==
He was born at Loughborough, Leicestershire, on 20 January 1801, the eldest of the three surviving sons of John Chapman, a clockmaker there. He received his education first at a school kept by Mr. Mowbray, and then under the Rev. T. Stevenson; he taught himself Greek, and paid a French workman of his father's to teach him French. With other young people he was an involved in the establishment of the Loughborough Permanent Library; and by 1817 he was devoting his Sundays to teaching in the Sunday school, and had become secretary of a peace society, and of the Hampden Club, of which his father was president. At this time he was helping his father in his business.

About 1822, when Chapman was admitted to the General Baptist church, he was concentrating on the machinery required for the bobbinet trade. He joined his brother William in setting up a factory for the production of this machinery; and in a few years was able to build large premises, with a steam-engine. A supporter of the philosophical radicals, when a riot broke out in Loughborough at the time of the Great Reform Bill, he diverted an attack on the rectory, though the rector was an opponent.

In 1832, Chapman visited France to investigate the lace-machine trade there. His own firm was doing a large business, then contraband, with foreign houses. Chapman and others petitioned parliament to repeal the machine exportation laws; but J. & W. Chapman was in 1834 completely ruined.

== In London ==
Chapman set off from Loughbrough to London, leaving his wife and children behind. He first worked for mathematical instrument makers, then obtained employment as mathematical tutor, and wrote for The Mechanics' Magazine, of which for a short time he was editor. He became secretary to the Safety Cabriolet and Two-wheel Carriage Company in 1830; in the same year his wife and children joined him in London. He improved the vehicle which Joseph Hansom was then building, in the direction of the later "Hansom cab". A patent for it was granted to him and an investor called Gillett, on 31 December 1836.

In 1838, Chapman became deacon and superintendent of the Sunday schools of a Baptist chapel, in Edward Street, that moved in 1840 to Praed Street. About the same time he was helping in the management of the Mechanic's Almanac, the Baptist Examiner, the Shareholder's Advocate, and the Railway Times. At a later period he contributed to The Times, Morning Advertiser, Economist, Daily News, Leader, and other publications.

== Lobbyist for Indian development ==
In 1842 Chapman was employed by George Thompson to consider the position of India and its trade and rights; and in 1844 he laid before the Board of Trade's railway department a project for constructing the Great Indian Peninsular Railway. He was treated at first as a visionary, but the Great Indian Peninsular Railway Company was set up, with offices at 3 New Broad Street, London.

Matters were put on foot in India by Sir George Arthur, 1st Baronet as governor of Bombay, who brought in George Thomas Clark to make an initial survey, to benefit the cotton trade. Chapman's role was to co-ordinate Bombay and London. He landed at Bombay in September 1845 to make preliminary investigations. He returned home in 1846 with his plans and his report completed.

Chapman's projected route was submitted to Robert Stephenson, who approved of it. Dissensions among the directors then caused an abrupt severance between Chapman and the company. His claim for payment was submitted for arbitration to the East India Company, and he was paid off with £2,500.

== Last years ==
Chapman's activities had obtained for him the support of Richard Cobden, John Bright, Thomas Babington Macaulay, Sir Charles Napier, Herbert Spencer, and others. He visited Loughborough in August 1854. After his return to London, he was suddenly seized with cholera on 10 September 1854 and died on 11 September, aged 53. He was buried in Kensal Green cemetery.

== Works ==
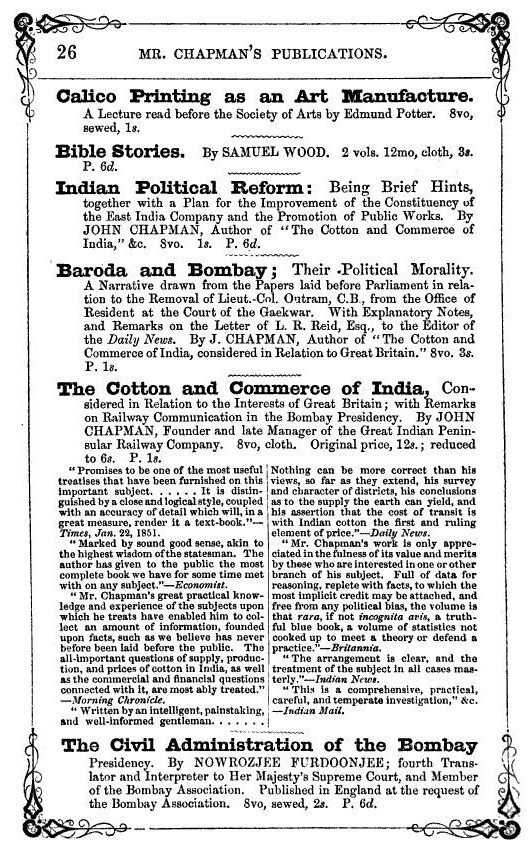
Chapman's books advertised, in a work by John Chapman the publisher, who was a cousin

Chapman issued a pamphlet in October 1847 on the cotton and salt question, entitled Remarks on Mr. Aylwin's Letter, and presented to parliament on behalf of Indian merchants in the Bombay presidency a petition for reform of civil government in India. He pursued inquiries about Indian cotton from 1848 to 1850 in Manchester and other places in preparation for The Cotton and Commerce of India, which he issued on 1 January 1851. He followed it by two papers in the Westminster Review, "The Government of India" (April 1852), and "Our Colonial Empire" (October of the same year).

In March 1853, Chapman issued Principles of Indian Reform ... concerning ... the Promotion of India Public Works, which went through a second edition at once; and wrote Baroda and Bombay, a protest against the removal of Colonel James Outram from his post as resident at the Guikwar's court at Baroda; a copy was sent to every Member of Parliament, and Outram was reinstated. Two months later, in May, he wrote an introductory preface, at the request of the Bombay Association, to Civil Administration of the Bombay Presidency by Nowrozjee Furdoonjee (Naoroji Furdunji), a Parsi reformer; his paper, "India and its Finance", appeared in the Westminster Review for July that year; his "Constitutional Reform", in the same pages, in January 1854; and his "Civil Service" in the number for July.

A major scheme for the irrigation of India was also being prepared by Chapman, and he was in communication concerning it with the Board of Control. When he died he left an unfinished paper, a review of Humboldt's Sphere and Duties of Government; and almost immediately after his death the government sanction for his irrigation scheme was delivered in full form. His unfinished paper appeared in its incomplete state in the Westminster Review of the next month, October; and the Review reprinted his "Government of India" paper in a subsequent number.

== Family ==
In December 1824, Chapman married Mary, daughter of John Wallis, a Loughborough lace manufacturer. His wife and three out of ten children survived him.

== See also ==
- Aerial steam carriage
- William Samuel Henson
- John Stringfellow
