= The Point, Greenwich =

Park in London, England

The Point
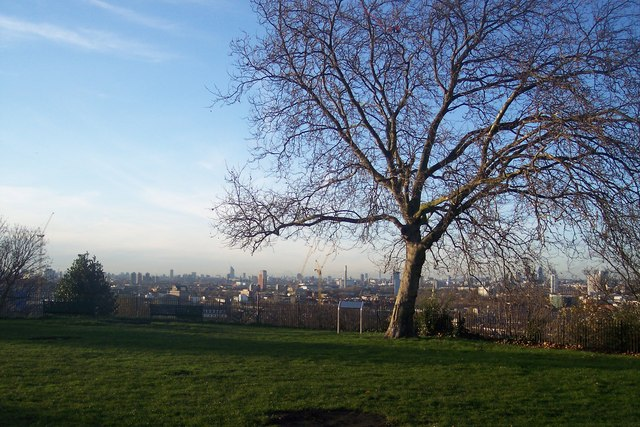
- The view of the London skyline from The Point

- Location within Royal Borough of Greenwich
- Location: Greenwich, London
- OS grid: TQ3876
- Coordinates: 51°28′25″N 0°0′34″W
- Area: Approx. 1.5 ha (3.7 acres)
- Elevation: Approx. 50 m (160 ft)
- Status: Open
- Public transit: Greenwich

The Point is a historic viewpoint and small public open space located in Greenwich, southeast London, England. The Point is also known for historical reasons as The Blackheath Point since it occupies an elevated position near the boundary with Blackheath and is one of the highest natural vantage points in the Royal Borough of Greenwich.

The Point offers panoramic views across London, including the Canary Wharf skyline, the City of London, and, in clear conditions, landmarks such as St Paul's Cathedral, the latter being a protected view.

== Location ==
The Point is situated west of Point Hill in the SE10 postcode district of London. Although it lies close to Blackheath and is frequently associated with it in informal usage, the site is administratively part of Greenwich and falls within the Royal Borough of Greenwich.

The surrounding area is predominantly residential, with the open space forming a small grassy area adjacent to the roadway at the crest of the hill.

== History ==
The elevated position of The Point has long made it notable as a place of observation.

Early maps of Kent and south-east London from the 16th and 17th centuries depict the ridge as a prominent feature above the river plain, although the viewpoint itself was not formally named. Historically, The Point was part of the Hundred of Blackheath, Kent, and therefore was named The Blackheath Point.

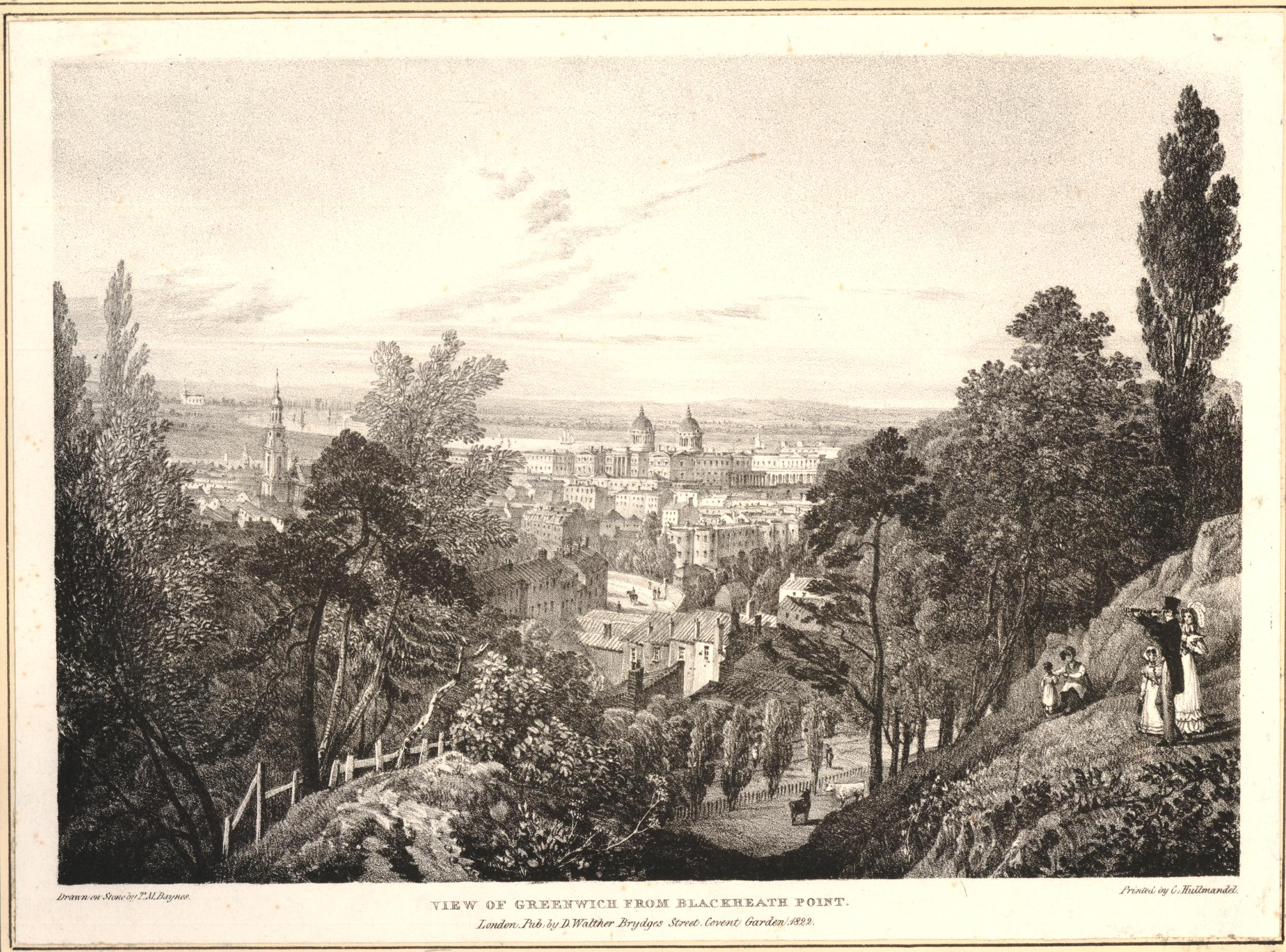
View in 1822 from The Point looking down over Greenwich towards the Old Royal Naval College and the River Thames.

From the 18th century onwards, the hill was recognised for its extensive views over the Thames corridor and surrounding countryside, which later expanded into the urban landscape of London. Artists and topographical illustrators working in and around Greenwich frequently depicted distant views across the Thames valley, with vantage points on surrounding hills used to frame the skyline of London. Views are consistent with perspectives seen in late 18th- and early 19th-century engravings and watercolours of the area.

During the 19th century, the streets surrounding The Point, such as Point Hill and Maidenstone Hill, became increasingly desirable as residential locations, and affluent professionals such as Frederick Brearey lived in the area. Large villas were constructed along the ridge, taking advantage of the views and cleaner air away from the industrialising riverfront. The open space at the summit remained undeveloped, preserving the historic viewpoint. The viewpoint itself remained publicly accessible and continued to be valued for its panoramic outlook rather than as a formally laid-out park.

== Description ==
The Point is not a designated park with defined boundaries, but rather a small public open space and viewpoint. Its elevation, approximately 50 metres above sea level, contributes to its prominence among London viewpoints despite its modest size.

Unlike larger open spaces such as Greenwich Park or the Heath, The Point consists primarily of a compact grassy area with seating and, at the western end, uninterrupted sightlines across the city.

== Views ==
From The Point, visitors can see a wide sweep of London's skyline. Visible features include:

- Canary Wharf
- The City of London
- St Paul's Cathedral (in clear weather)
- Parts of the Thames corridor

The viewpoint is particularly noted for sunset and night-time views of illuminated skyscrapers.

== Cultural significance ==
The Point is regarded as a local landmark rather than a major tourist attraction. It is frequently described as a hidden or lesser-known viewpoint and is popular with photographers and local residents seeking a quieter alternative to more heavily visited London viewpoints.

Its position close to the Greenwich–Blackheath boundary has also contributed to its identity as a symbolic meeting point between the two areas.

== College Place ==
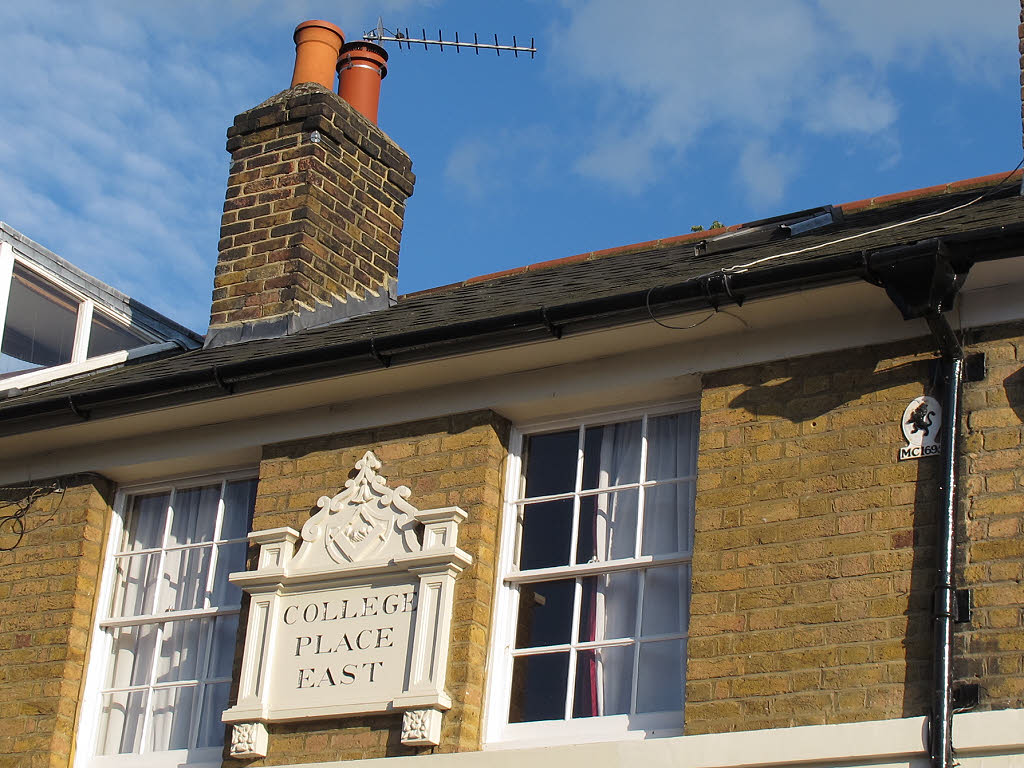
College Place East plaque on Maidenstone Hill.

College Place West (Nos. 37–75 odd on Maidenstone Hill) is an early-19th-century terrace of two-storey cottages, designed under the supervision of George Smith, surveyor to Morden College, and shown on a block plan dated 1842 curving down and around the hillside. The terrace is characterised by multi-coloured stock brick, slate roofs of moderate pitch with eaves soffits, stucco first-floor sill bands, gauged flat brick arches to sash windows, and round-headed door openings set within arched recesses. Similarly, College Place East (Nos. 1–33 odd on Maidenstone Hill) was built in phases between the 1820s and 1840s on land belonging to Morden College.

== See also ==
- Greenwich
- Blackheath
- Greenwich Park
