= Chard Museum =

Museum in Chard, Somerset, England

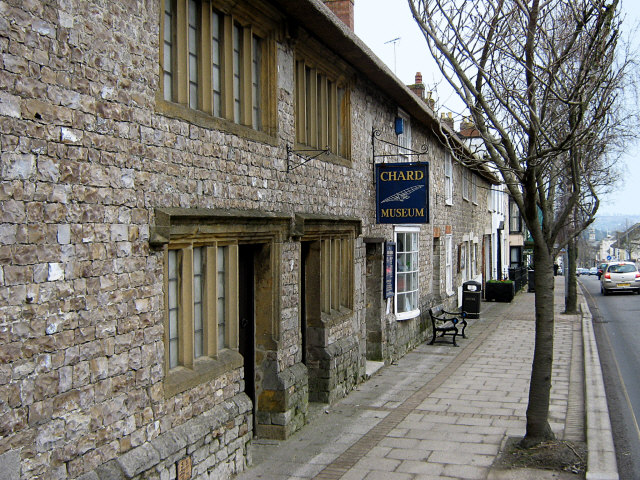
- The museum building

- Location within Somerset
- Established: 1970
- Location: Godworthy House, Chard, Somerset, England, United Kingdom
- Coordinates: 50.8728°N 2.9587°W
- Type: Local museum
- President: Tony Prior
- Website: Chard Museum

Chard Museum is a small local museum in Chard, Somerset, England. It opened in 1970, in a converted 16th century listed building, with collections of exhibits about local history and displays related to the lives of notable local residents.

== History ==
The basis of the collection dates from around 1880 when Arthur Hull collected ‘curiosities’. He left these to the town and in 1917 they were transferred to the Museum of Somerset in Taunton, before returning to the new museum in 1970.

The museum is housed in a 16th-century thatched building which was originally four cottages. The building was converted and restored for use as a museum in 1970, and later incorporated the building next door which had been the New Inn public house.

In 2010 doubts were raised about the ongoing funding of the museum.

== Collection ==
Exhibits within the museum tell the story of the town and the local area including geology, the fire of 1577, the Monmouth Rebellion and local lace mills. Outside there is a blacksmith's forge and display of farm machinery.

There are also displays on notable people with connections to the town.

John Stringfellow and another local man William Samuel Henson achieved the first powered flight, in 1848, in a disused lace factory, with a 10-foot (3 m), steam-driven flying machine.

James Gillingham pioneered the development of articulated artificial limbs, after working as a shoemaker in the town and seeing a man who had his arm so badly shattered in an accidental explosion of a cannon that it had to be amputated to the shoulder socket. The museum includes a representation of his consulting room, including several examples of his artificial limbs.

Corporal Samuel Vickery who was awarded the VC in 1897 for his actions during the attack on the Dargai Heights, Tirah, India during the Tirah Campaign.

Margaret Bondfield, who was an English Labour politician and feminist, the first woman Cabinet minister in the United Kingdom and a member of the Congregational Church.
