= James Gillingham =

Prosthetic limbs creator

James Gillingham (1839–1924) was a prosthetic limb manufacturer based in Chard, Somerset in the 19th century and one of the first to have photographs taken of his works.

== Early life ==
Gillingham was educated at Chard School.

== Career ==
Gillingham was a Victorian boot and shoemaker at his Golden Shoe shop until 1863 when he began making artificial limbs from leather and molded like a pair of shoes. His first prosthetic limb was for William Singleton, a local man who lost an arm firing a cannon for a celebratory salute, which Gillingham made at no cost to Singleton. He then made prostheses on a permanent basis. Chard, as a result, became a major centre of the British artificial limb industry. Samples from Gillingham's workshop are on display at the Chard Museum.

The Lancet medical journal in a 1868 article described Gillingham's prostheses as "strong, light, and durable" and took 10 days to make, were "easy wearing and not likely to get out of repair; simple in construction, and as beautiful as life in appearance." Nicknamed the 'Leather Leg', Gillingham molded the leather to the patient's limb before hardening it. By 1910, he had restored mobility and function to more than 15,000 patients. He took black-and-white photos to show the detail and fit of each prosthetic.

Gillingham's story was included in the BBC One 2017 documentary titled Invented in… that featured the Chard Museum.

== Book ==
In 2001, author Derrick W. Warren wrote the book James Gillingham: Surgical Mechanist & Manufacturer of Artificial Limbs, published by Somerset Industrial Archaeological Society.
