= William Samuel Henson =

British-born aviation pioneer, engineer and inventor

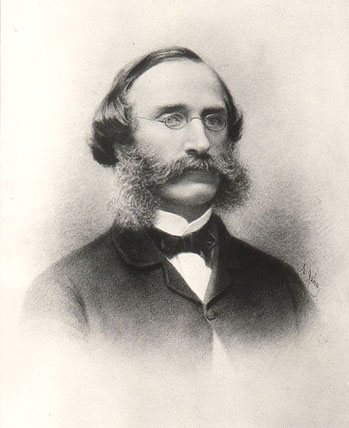
- Born: 3 May 1812; Nottingham, England
- Died: 22 March 1888 (aged 75); Newark, New Jersey
- Known for: Aerial Steam Carriage
- Spouse: Sarah Henson (m. 1848)
- Children: 7

William Samuel Henson (3 May 1812 – 22 March 1888) was a British-born pre-Wright brothers aviation pioneer, engineer and inventor. He is best known for his work on the aerial steam carriage alongside John Stringfellow.

== Biography ==
Henson was born in Nottingham, England on 3 May 1812. Henson was involved in lace-making in Chard and he obtained a patent on improved lace-making machines in 1835. Henson is best known as an early pioneer in aviation but he patented many other inventions, some of which are in wide use today.

In 1849 William Henson and his wife, Sarah, left England and moved to the United States, joining his father and settling in Newark, New Jersey. Henson never did any further aviation research while in the United States and worked as a machinist, civil engineer and inventor. He had 7 children, only 4 of whom lived to adulthood.

Henson remained in the United States for the remainder of his life, except for a short period between 1864 and 1866 when he lived in Peru. died on 22 March 1888 in Newark, New Jersey. He and most of his family were buried in Rosedale Cemetery in Orange, New Jersey.

== Aeronautical inventions ==
Starting c. 1838, Henson became interested in aviation. In April 1841 he patented an improved lightweight steam engine, and with fellow lacemaking-engineer John Stringfellow in c. 1842 he designed a large passenger-carrying steam-powered monoplane, with a wing span of 150 feet, which he named the "Henson Aerial Steam Carriage". He received a patent on it in 1843 along with Stringfellow.

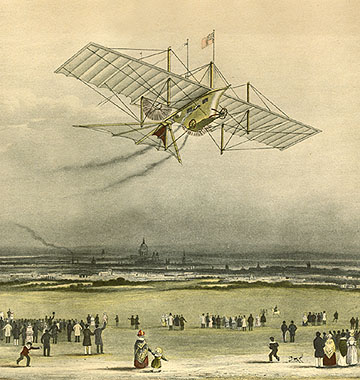
1843 engraving of the Aerial Steam Carriage

Henson, Stringfellow, Frederick Marriott, and D.E. Colombine, incorporated as the Aerial Transit Company in 1843 in England, with the intention of raising money to construct the flying machine. Henson built a scale model of his design, which made one tentative steam-powered "hop" as it lifted, or bounced, off its guide wire. Attempts were made to fly the small model, and a larger model with a 20-foot wing span, between 1844 and 1847, without success.

Henson grew discouraged, married and emigrated in 1849 to the United States, while Stringfellow continued to experiment with aviation.

Henson appeared as a character in a fictional newspaper story by Edgar Allan Poe, which recounted a supposed trans-Atlantic balloon trip, in which Henson was one of the passengers on the balloon.

Henson and Stringfellow are frequently mentioned in books on the history of aviation. The Royal Aeronautical Society holds annual "Henson-Stringfellow" lectures; as of 2008 they have held 52. A glacier in Antarctica is named after him due to his work in aviation (Henson Glacier: 64'06'S, 60'11'W).

Henson and Stringfellow were referred to in the 1965 film The Flight of the Phoenix.

=== Aerial Design ===
The Aerial's wings were rectangular, and were formed by wooden spars covered with fabric, and braced, internally and externally, with wires. The Aerial Steam Carriage was to be powered by two contra-rotating six-bladed propellers mounted in the rear in a push-type system. The design follows earlier "birdlike" gliders, and the ideas of George Cayley, and Henson corresponded with Cayley in an attempt to obtain funding after the efforts to obtain the support of Parliament and sell stock failed. The Aerial Transit Company never built the largest version of the Aerial Steam Carriage because of the failed attempts with the medium-sized model. Henson, Stringfellow, Marriott and Colombine dissolved the company around 1848.

=== Advertising ===
The Aerial Transit Company's publicist, Frederick Marriott, commissioned prints in 1843 depicting the Aerial Steam Carriage over the pyramids of Egypt, in India, and over London, England, and other places, which drew considerable interest from the public. The prints have appeared on several stamps of various countries. Marriott later became an aviation pioneer in California.

== Other inventions and innovations ==
Henson obtained a number of patents in widely varying areas. Major patents include a lace-making decoration in 1835, lightweight steam engines in 1841, a flying machine in 1843, and a T-handled safety razor in 1847.

Henson invented the modern form of the razor, the T-shaped safety razor, and patented it in 1847: "the cutting blade of which is at right angles with the handle, and resembles somewhat the form of a common hoe." While a major improvement on the previous form of safety razor, an additional improvement was needed to make safety razors common. In 1901, Gillette combined Henson's T-shaped safety razor with disposable blades, and produced the modern razor.

Henson published a pamphlet on astronomy in 1871 suggesting that the Solar System formed from cold dust and gas, and discussed how it could condense into meteors and comets, and further condense into planets, moons and the Sun, in the process heating up. He also discusses how this would lead to the planets orbiting in the ecliptic and rotating in the same general plane.

Henson created inventions in other areas as well. Among them were ice-making machines (1870), fabric waterproofing, and cistern-cleaning. He patented and submitted a proposal for an improved low-recoil breech-loading cannon design to the US Navy in 1861; it was rejected as impractical.

== The Henson Aerial Steam Carriage ==
- Small model, wingspan unknown
- Medium model, wingspan 20 feet
- Full-size aircraft, wingspan 150 feet (never built)

== See also ==
- Adelaide Gallery
- George Cayley, aviation pioneer
- John Chapman, engineer
