= 20 Dartmouth Hill =

Coordinates: 51.4717°N 0.0078°W

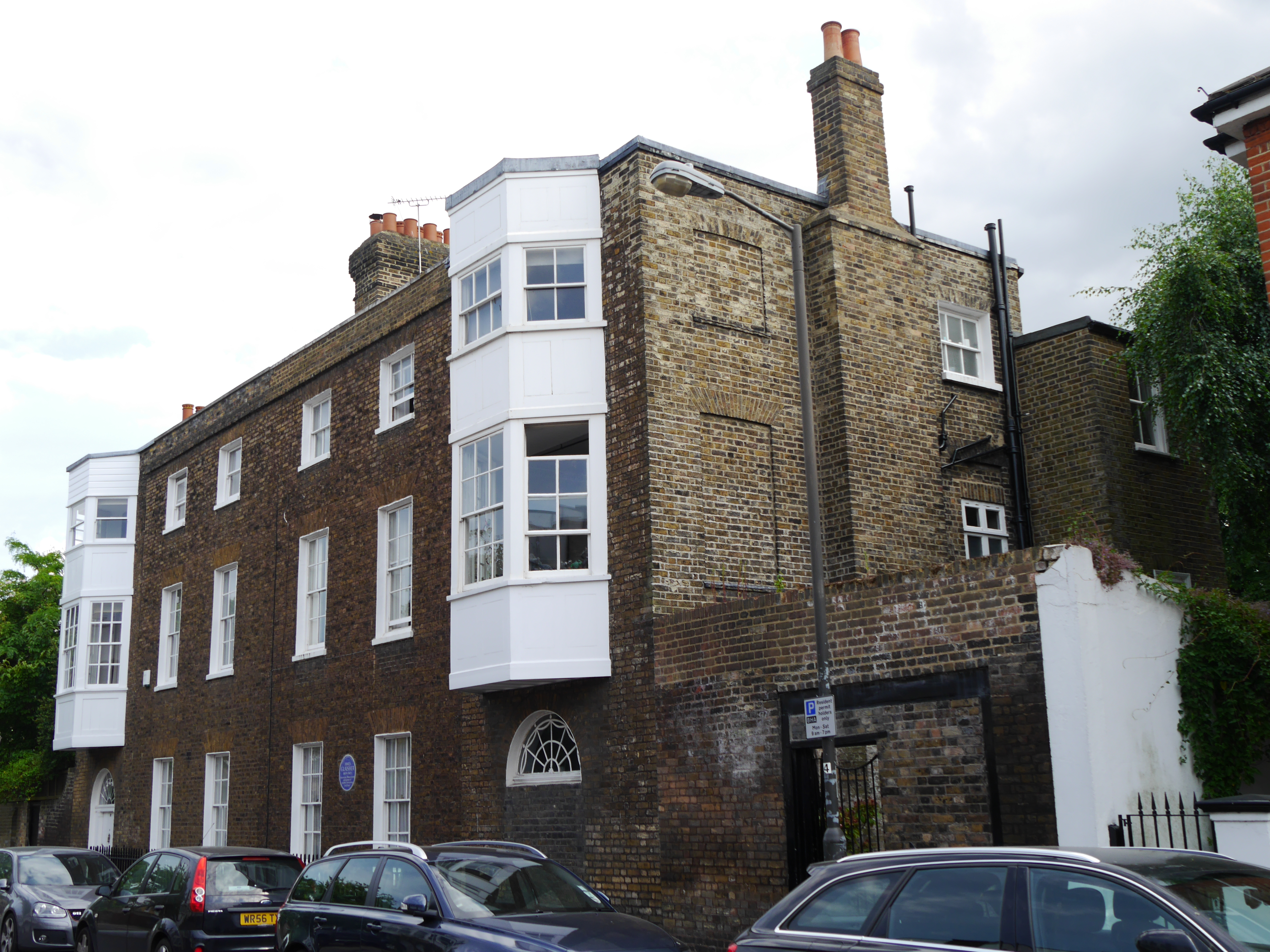
- Interactive map of the 20 Dartmouth Hill area

General information
- Location: Blackheath, London

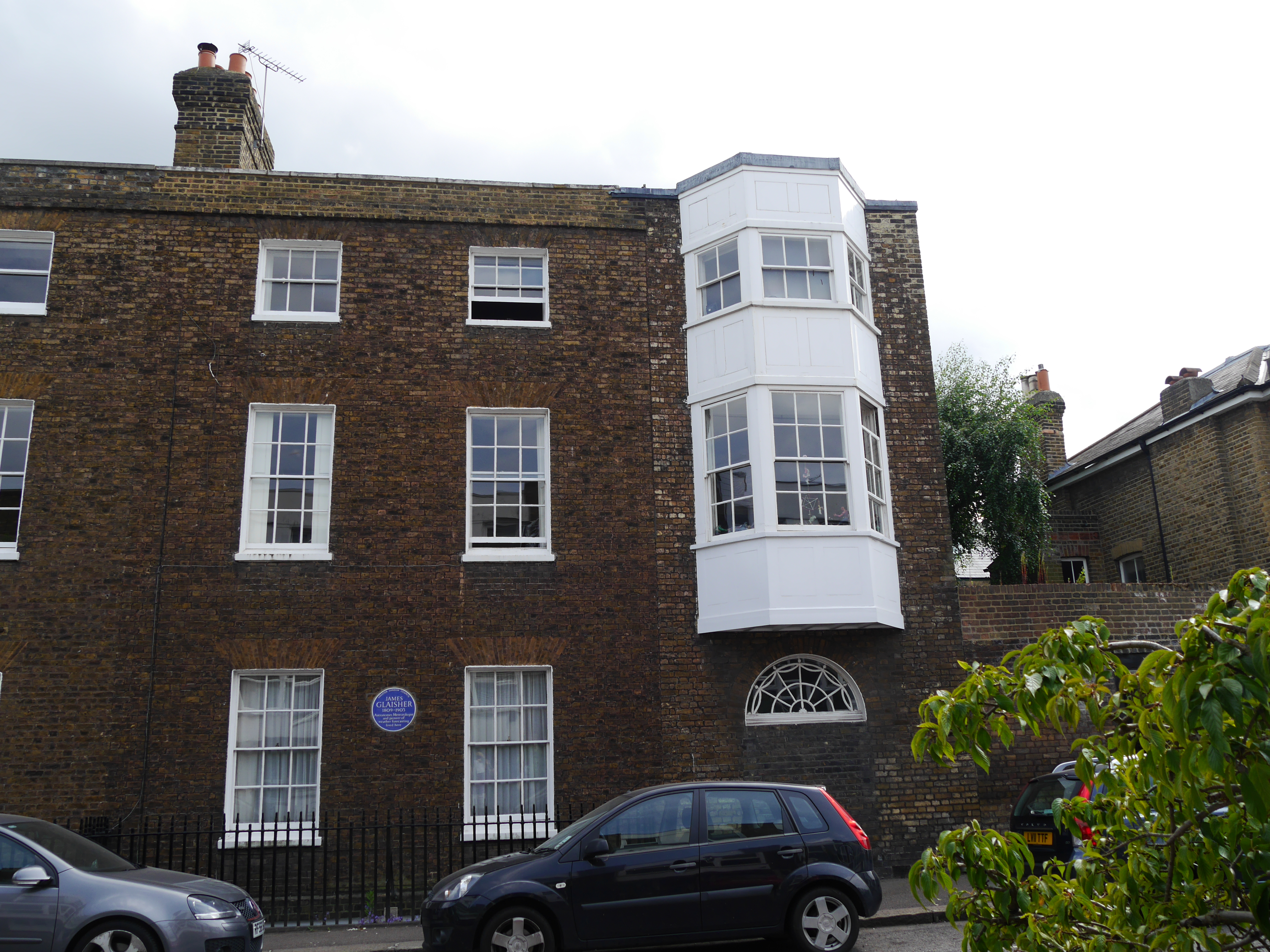
20 Dartmouth Hill, London

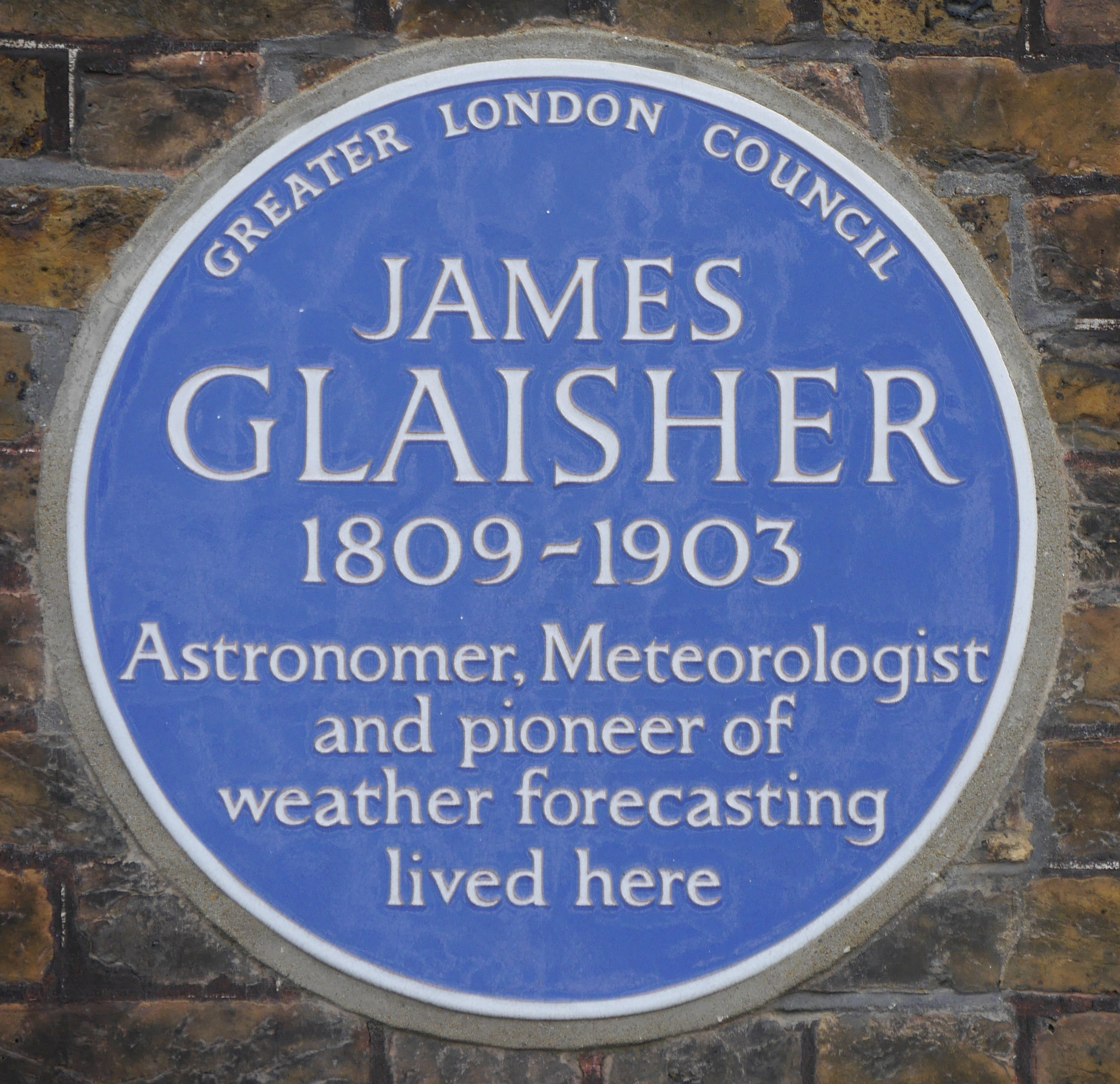
Blue plaque, 20 Dartmouth Hill

20 Dartmouth Hill is a Grade II listed building at 20 Dartmouth Hill, Blackheath, London, SE10.

The house dates from the late 18th century. It was lived in by the meteorologist and aeronaut James Glaisher FRS (1809–1903).
