= Daniel O'Connell (journalist) =

Irish poet, actor, writer and journalist

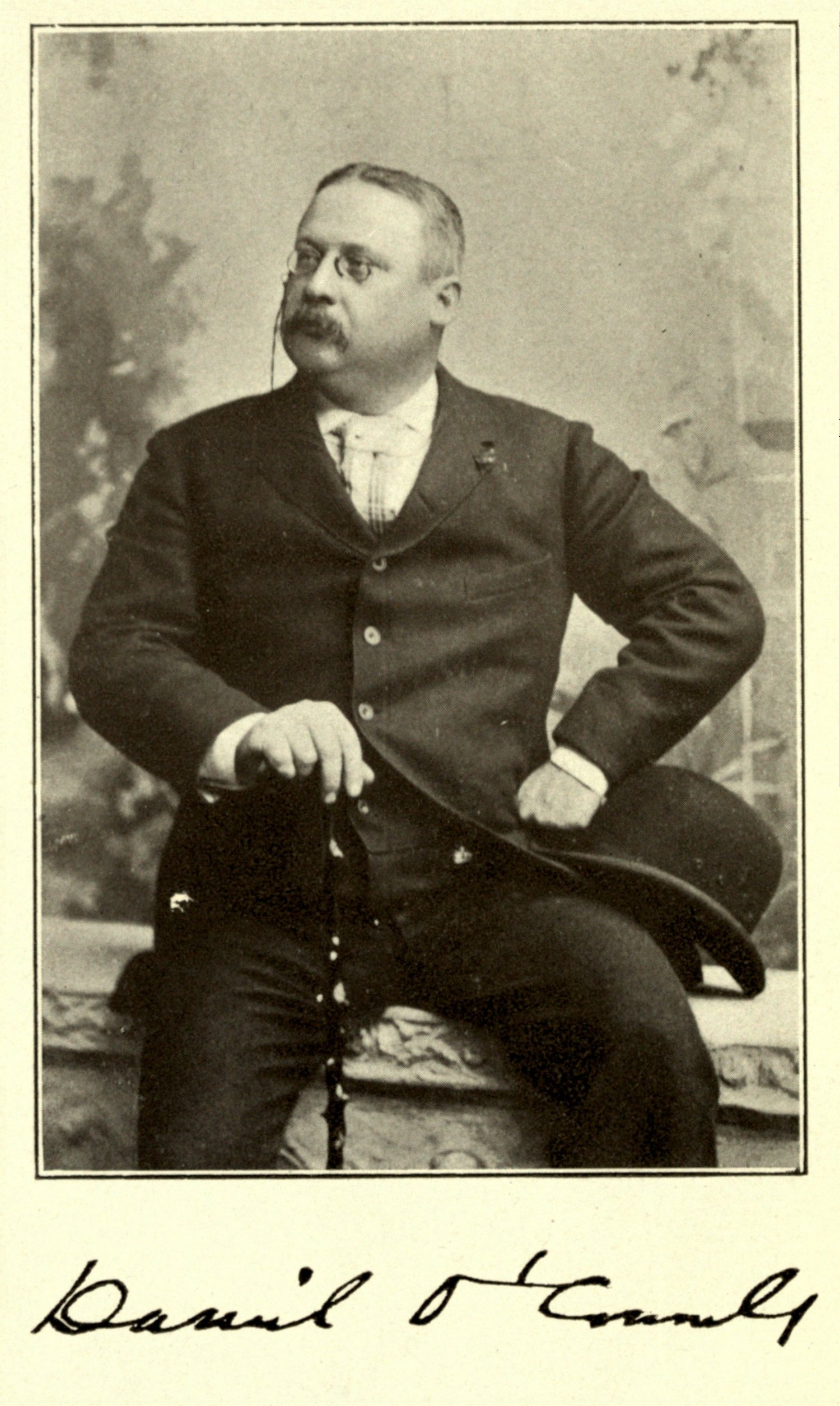
- Daniel O'Connell, posing with his Irish blackthorn walking stick
- Born: 1849; County Clare, Ireland
- Died: 23 January 1899 (aged 49–50); Sausalito, California U.S.
- Education: Belvedere College; Clongowes Wood College
- Spouse: Anna Ashley

Daniel O'Connell (II) (1849 – 23 January 1899) was a poet, actor, writer and journalist in San Francisco, California, and a co-founder of the Bohemian Club. He was the grand-nephew of Daniel O'Connell (1775–1847), the famed Irish orator and politician.

O'Connell's strict classics-oriented education in Ireland stood him in good stead for his early career choices of teacher and journalist. In San Francisco, he formed friendships with artists and influential men who joined with him in presenting and promoting theatrical productions and in publishing books and newspapers. He wrote short stories for magazines and journals, and lived a life rich in food, drink, and the arts. A dedicated family man in America, O'Connell never lost his Irish poet's sense of overarching sadness joined with keen pleasure in the sensations of the physical world.

== Early career ==
O'Connell was born to distinguished lawyer Charles O'Connell in 1849 in Ennis, County Clare, Ireland, some two years after the death of his famed grand-uncle Daniel O'Connell. Young O'Connell attended Belvedere College, a Jesuit school in Dublin, but was called home at the deaths of his mother and sister in a coach accident. This tragic event was later judged to be the source of O'Connell's sense of the impermanence of the world. After the funeral, he was transferred without enthusiasm to Clongowes Wood College where he studied the classics for three years. O'Connell signed on with the Royal Navy as a midshipman. He traveled around Cape Horn to California in 1868.

After disembarking in San Francisco, O'Connell took a position as professor of belles-lettres at Santa Clara College, then accepted an offer from St. Ignatius College in San Francisco to teach Greek.

== Writer ==
O'Connell worked for a number of periodicals in the San Francisco Bay Area. He edited the Morning Herald, the San Francisco Times, the Bulletin, the Chronicle, the Wasp, the Bohemian and the Portico. He helped Henry George found the San Francisco Daily Evening Post in 1871. His best work includes "The Thrust in Tierce," a short story written for the Overland Monthly, and a yearly Christmas piece, "quaint, grotesque or poetical" usually describing the serio-comic antics of would-be San Francisco aristocrats with little claim to fame.

== Bohemian Club ==
In 1872 with a group of other Chronicle newspaper staffers, O'Connell helped form the Bohemian Club. At first, the group rented a modest room as their clubhouse, and spent many evenings enjoying food, drink, music and the literary arts. Chronicle publisher M. H. de Young later wrote that the Bohemian membership of some of his employees was "not an unmixed blessing" because the "boys would go there sometimes when they should have reported at the office." De Young said that "very often" when O'Connell sat down to a good dinner, "he would forget that he had a pocketful of notes for an important story."

"Dan," as he was called by his friends, was a very active Bohemian, and was described as the "Prince of the club" when he wasn't being toasted as "the rightful King of Munster." O'Connell took part in many Bohemian poetry readings and stage plays, including a turn as King Macbeth of Scotland in the witches' scene from Macbeth. O'Connell was the first member to formally announce an upcoming "Jinks" (literary and musical performance)—his turn at host, or "Sire", of an evening's entertainment took place 30 November 1872 with the stated theme of "Tom Moore and Offenbach." The Jinks events at the club were usually cheerful and sometimes boisterous. One of O'Connell's Jinks announcements joked that the "opening discordancy" of the presentation would be played by the Bohemian Club's own musicians, "who have done so much to lower the rents in this neighborhood."

In 1876, O'Connell wrote the preface and edited a book of stories by William Henry Rhodes (a Bohemian who wrote under the pen-name "Caxton") entitled Caxton's Book. In 1878, O'Connell worked for The Mail, an early newspaper in San Francisco. With his adroit editing, O'Connell helped make famous the "Town Crier" column for the San Francisco News Letter, written by Ambrose Bierce, then by Ashton Stevens.

In 1881, O'Connell published Lyrics, a book of poetry evincing a "Celtic strain." The poetry displays O'Connell's sense of sunt lacrimae rerum, that there will be tears with trials, and it expresses his bittersweet joy in life's evanescent pleasures. O'Connell wrote an Irish-themed play, The Red Fox, which was staged with moderate success in San Francisco about 1882. O'Connell wrote "Ghoul's Quest" for The Argonaut. In 1891, he published The Inner Man: Good Things to Eat and Drink and Where to Get Them, a collection of anecdotes and advice for the epicurean who finds himself in the San Francisco area, and a cautionary description of common 19th century food adulterants such as chemical dyes and powdered lead.

O'Connell wrote the libretto for a romantic opera entitled Bluff King Hal, working with fellow Bohemian Club member Humphrey John Stewart who composed the music. The opera was performed at San Francisco's Grand Opera House in 1892, with artist and Bohemian Amédée Joullin designing the costumes and painting the scenery, and architect and Bohemian Willis Polk modelling and designing the scenery.

O'Connell was elected honorary life member of the Bohemian Club in the late 1890s and was made club historian.

== Personal life ==
In 1874, O'Connell married Annie Ashley, called Mabel, the daughter of California state senator and U.S. representative from Nevada Delos R. Ashley, who had died the previous year. The marriage produced seven children. The O'Connell marriage was described by a close friend as a perfect union, "with kindred tastes and boy-and-girl love." With seven children who adored their father, the O'Connell home became a "small world where love reigned." Gipsy O'Connell, one of the daughters, later expressed that her favourite of her father's poems was "Sing Me A Ringing Anthem" from Lyrics.

== Death and remembrance ==
O'Connell died suddenly in 1899 from a cold that turned into pneumonia. The New York Times published an obituary and printed a quatrain by the Australian poet Adam Lindsay Gordon incorrectly stating that it was one of O'Connell's:

Life is only foam and bubbles;
Two things stand like stone—
Kindness in another's troubles,
Courage in your own.

In 1900, Ina Coolbrith, Bohemian Club librarian, edited a collection of O'Connell's poetry, entitled Songs from Bohemia, copyrighted to Mabel Ashley O'Connell. Coolbrith ended the book with "The Chamber of Sleep", the last poem by O'Connell, written ten days before his death. William Greer Harrison wrote in a memorial foreword that O'Connell was an avid outdoorsman of eternally sunny disposition. He mentioned his appreciation for good food and his fine chef's skill in delicate cookery. Harrison wrote of his flair for swordsmanship and his pleasure in fishing, and noted that during any of these activities, O'Connell could be seen pausing to write down on a scrap of paper an idea for a story.

Mabel Ashley O'Connell died of grief a year after her husband. Harrison wrote that she "lingered here only long enough to say farewell to her many friends, and then joined her husband in the land that is hidden from material eyes, where love and life are one."

Charles Rollo Peters (1862-1928), the San Franciscan painter, a very close friend of his, designed two memorials for him, the memorial seat at Sausalito and a further one, located somewhere in the Marin hills. This memorial consists of a bronze tablet affixed to an oak tree bearing the words “In loving memory of Daniel O ’ Connell, poet, philosopher, friend.” In an interview Rollo said:

“There was a fitting celebration. Porter Ashe, Ned Hamilton and others recalled the good old days when “The Roseleaves ” fluttered about in madcap merriment. And then the tablet was left to Mother Nature and to the silence which is only broken by the soughing of the breeze through the branches and the music of the bee and the katydid . Only the wanderer in the hills or the devout pilgrim seeking out shrines of song will find the tablet on the oak. 'Dan O ’Connell loved God ’s out-of-doors,' said Peters when I asked him about the memorial . “He delighted in life in the open . He was an excellent shot, a skilled fly fisher and an expert yachtsman . So it seemed right to commemorate him in the hills and among the trees.”

== See also ==
- O'Connell of Derrynane
