= William Henry Rhodes =

American poet (1822–1876)

William Henry Rhodes

William Henry Rhodes (July 16, 1822–1876) is known for his short story, The Case of Summerfield, which appeared in 1871 in a San Francisco newspaper under the pseudonym Caxton.

== Early years ==
William Henry Rhodes was born in Windsor, North Carolina, July 16, 1822. In 1844, his father, Col. E. A. Rhodes, was appointed United States Consul to Texas. Rhodes was then just budding into manhood. Possessing a great ambition, and a mind superior to his companions, he became a leader among the young men of Galveston, where his father was located in his office as Consul. Here he gathered around him an Association of young men, whose zealous natures were congenial to his lofty ambition

In 1844, he entered Harvard law school, where he remained for two years. After he completed his study at Harvard he returned to Galveston, where he entered upon the practice of his profession. In 1847 he was elevated to a Probate Judgeship. He filled this office with distinction for one term, at the close of which he returned to his native state and entered upon the practice of his profession. He remained in North Carolina but a short time when he caught the inspiration of adventure in the new El Dorado, and sailed for California.

On July 2, 1869, Rhodes was invited to the first powered flight in America at San Jose's Shellmount Park racetrack. The flight was of an unmanned, steam powered dirigible operated by Frederick Marriott.

== The Case of Summerfield ==
The Case of Summerfield was published in the Sacramento Union newspaper in 1871 and included a character named Black Bart which later became the alias for Charles Bolles. At the time of its publication, this story was the talk of the town more for the concept of being able to set water on fire then for the idea of Black Bart. It was the story's villain, however, that caught Charles Bolles' attention and he later used the intimidating name which would be familiar to many in California as an alias in his poems left behind at crime scenes.

== Later years ==
Rhodes was buried in Laurel Hill, California with his wife and daughter.

== List of works ==
- Rhodes, William H., The Indian Gallows and Other Poems in Two Parts (New York: E. Walker, 1846)
- Rhodes, W. H. The Political Letters of "Caxton" (San Francisco: Alta California Power Presses, 1855)
- Anonymous, The Emerald Isle: A Poem (San Francisco: Printed by Mullin, Mahon & Co., 1869)
- McKinstry, Elisha Williams, Twenty-First Anniversary of the Corporate Society of California Pioneers Oration by Hon. E.W. McKinstry; Poem by Wm. H. Rhodes, Esq. (San Francisco: Published by order of the society, 1871)
- Anonymous, Caxton's Book: A Collection of Essays, Poems, and Sketches (San Francisco: A. L. Bancroft and Company, 1876)
- Anonymous, The Case of Summerfield (San Francisco: Paul Elder & Co., 1907)
- Palmquist, Peter E. (ed.), Phases in the Life of John Pollexfen, or, How Did John Pollexfen, the Photographer, Make His Fortune? (Arcata, California: P.E. Palmquist, 1999)
