= List of Henry vacuum cleaners =

Henry is a series of canister vacuum cleaners which were first manufactured by Numatic International in 1981, and are most notable for their human-like faces, which are often considered cute, on their bodies or heads. They come in a variety of colours, names and sizes, and have a wide range of additional tools, but some models in the series have been discontinued since their introduction.

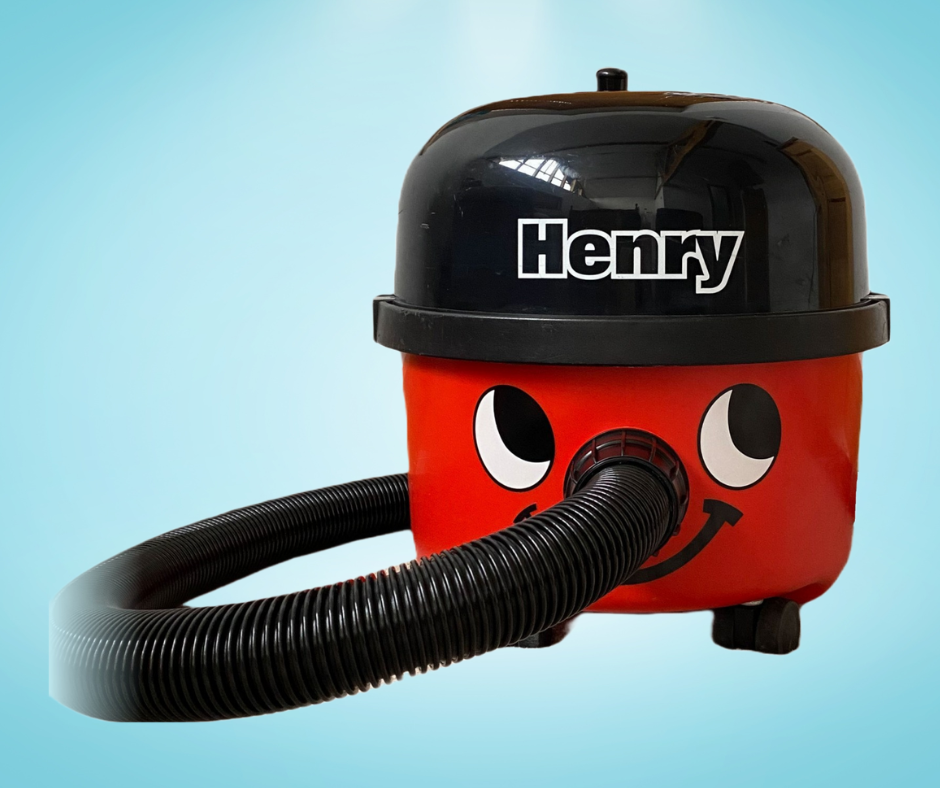
2001 Numatic Henry HVR200 with new style conical hose

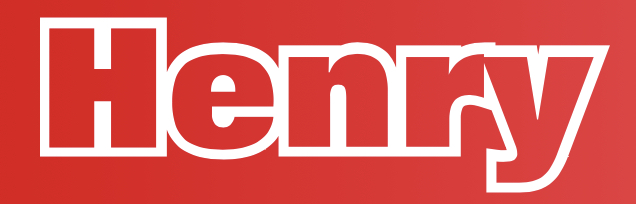
Numatic's Henry Logo

== Current main-series vacuums ==
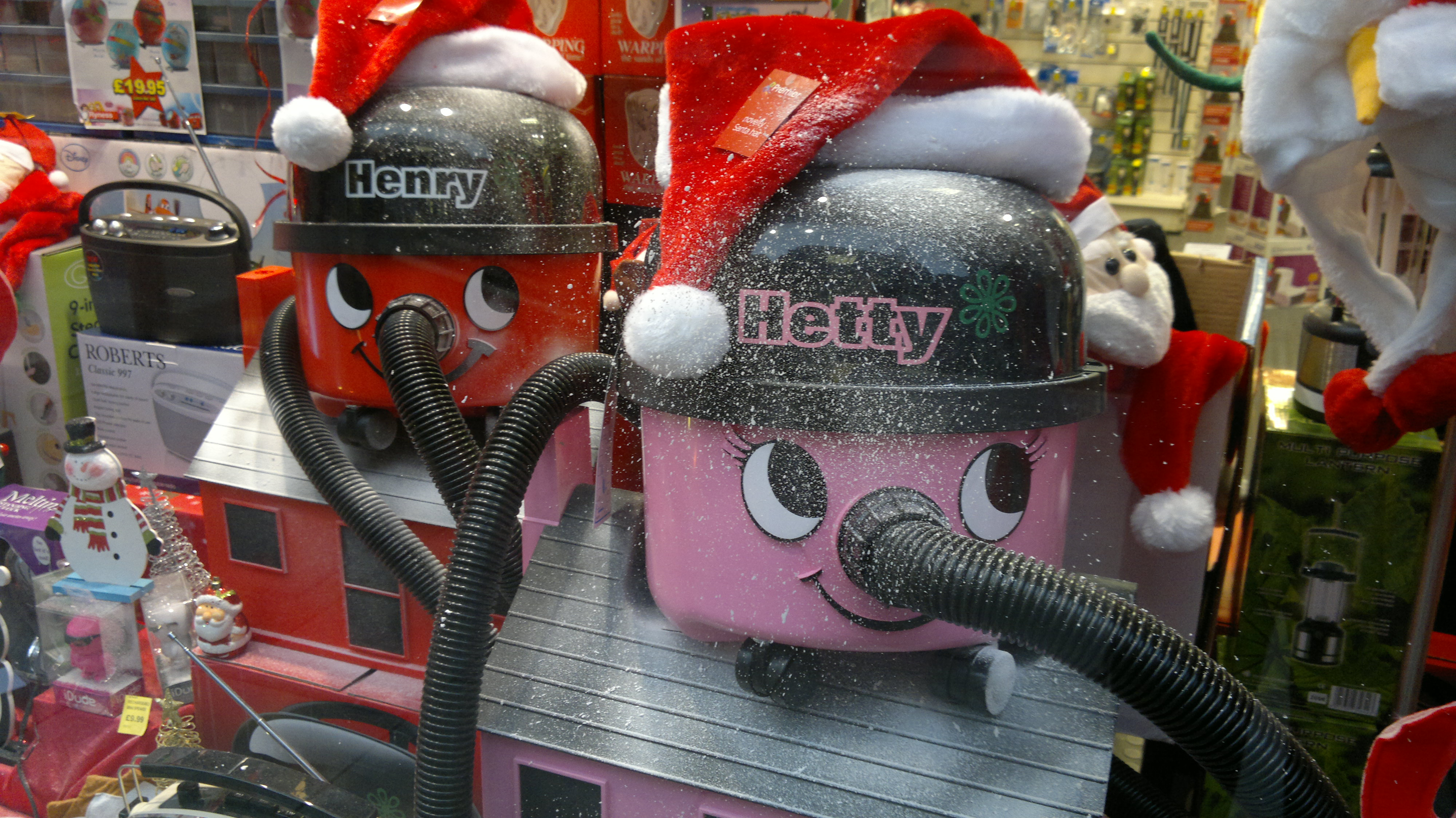
A Henry HVR200 and Hetty HET200 in a store window at Christmas

This is a list of current Henry models which are being manufactured in the main series, which means they have "Henry" or another name on their caps and a face on their bodies. Some models do not have names, and as a result, only have "Numatic" on their caps, and in certain cases other words such as "Micro-filter". There are a total of fourteen current main-series Henry vacuums. Some models have been out for numerous years, meaning many of these models' looks have been changed over time, but the parts, power and bag size have stayed the same.

- Henry (and Hetty) Compact (HVR160 and HET160) - Smaller and more compact versions of the standard Henry models, 6-litre capacity.
- Henry Professional (HVR240) - A slightly larger version of the standard (9-litre) model for professional and retail applications.
- Henry Cordless (HVB160) - A more compact version of the standard Henry model running off two 36-volt batteries, 6-litre capacity.
- Henry Xtra (HVX200 and HVX160) - A version of the standard (9-litre) Henry model designed for carpet care and cleaning pet hairs. A smaller and more compact version of this model (which, like all the other "compact" Henry models, has a 6-litre capacity) also exists.
- Henry Allergy (HVA160) - A smaller, light blue version of the standard Henry model for capturing allergens, 6-litre capacity.
- Henry Wash (HVW370) - A larger, dark blue version unlike any one of the standard Henry models, carpet cleaner, 15-litre capacity.
- Henry Quick - A cordless stick vacuum cleaner, much different to the other drum models. It only has a 60 minute battery life. 1-litre capacity.
- Charles (CVC370) - Larger blue wet-and-dry vacuum with a 15-litre dry and a 9-litre wet capacity which was also available in red, green and yellow at one time. In the late 1980s, this model and some others were also manufactured with a cream-and-brown colour scheme.
- George (GVE370) - Larger green "all-in-one" vacuum with a 15-litre dry and a 9-litre wet capacity which was also available in red, blue and yellow at one time. In 2015 the then-Chancellor of the Exchequer, George Osborne, was called on to help make several blue instances of this model when he visited Numatic International's manufacturing plant in Chard, Somerset.
- James (JVP180) (Blue) - Blue high performance vacuum. Originally Yellow but discontinued and rereleased as blue in 2019
- Harry (HHR200) - Green, originally released under the name of "Henry Hound" in 2003 and designed specifically for pet owners.
- Hetty (HET200) - Short for Henrietta, pink "feminine" version of Henry, introduced in 2007 for gender-specific marketing. The face on this model, unlike all the others, has long eyelashes.

== Current secondary-series vacuums ==
This is a list of current Henry models which are being manufactured in the secondary series, which means they have "Numatic" on their cap rather than a name (however, they still have a face on their bodies). These vacuums are often very similar to main-series ones but opt to not use the names for more industrial reasons. The PSP240 is also the basis for what the (now-discontinued) Bertie and Jack later became.

- PPR240, PPR370 and NBV190 - Red in colour and similar to the Henry Professional (HVR240), the now-discontinued Edward (EVR370) and the standard Henry (HVR200) respectively (however, their power switches are on the fronts of their caps as opposed to the backs of them).
- PSP180, PSP240 and PSP370 - Blue in colour with caddy tops and similar to both versions of James (NNV200 and JVP180) respectively.
- NRP240 - Green in colour and similar to the PPR240 but without an eco 420W motor.
- NRV240 - Most common and popular commercial version of the Henry 200 with a dust bucket with a bumper, now only available in red, going forward it’s likely this machine will be discontinued or the bucket made from recycled black plastic.

== Mops ==
Numatic International have also made a total of two mops in their line of Henry products. These two mops are the only ones they have ever made, and they are still currently in production (they also have an image of the faces from the Henry and Hetty vacuum cleaners on them).

- Henry (and Hetty) Spray Mop (HM40) - Red and pink in colour respectively, to match the Henry and Hetty vacuum cleaners themselves.

== Discontinued and low-production vacuums ==
These Henry models have either been discontinued or put into a lower production state by Numatic International. These can still be bought online or in electronics stores if retailers still have them and/or are receiving them from the shorter amount being produced by Numatic.

- Henry (HVR200) & Hetty (HET200) - Red, and Pink, base model. Originally released without rewinding cable as model HVC200, but one was added at a later date. Also available in blue, cream (early models), green and yellow at one time. On early models, the face was also three stickers that had to be applied manually. Only available through select stores in certain countries.
- James (JVP180) (Yellow) - Yellow, professional vacuum and high performance with a caddy top and an 8-litre capacity. Originally introduced in 2002 as model NNV200 and coloured purple, it was rereleased at a later date (and its colour was changed from yellow to blue in 2019).
- Henry Micro (HVR200M) - A more advanced Henry with a special allergen filter, introduced in 2002. This machine was made obsolete by Henry Allergy and was discontinued in November 2022, following an online sale which cleared all remaining stock.
- Henry (HVC200) - The original version of the first Henry vacuum cleaner which did not have a rewinding cable is now discontinued.
- Henry (HVR160, HVR200 and HVR240) - All earlier models of these three Henrys besides their current versions are now discontinued.
- Henry Turbo (HVR200T) - This Henry model which came with a 24-volt turbo-electric self-adjusting power brush is now discontinued.
- Basil (NB200) - A reproduced version of the original HVC200 Henry, serving as a cheaper alternative to the main machine with an 1100w single stage motor. Launched in 1994 and discontinued in 2007, Basil came in the standard Henry colours of red, blue, yellow and green, but was also available in lime and black and orange and black as a Halloween special edition in 2005. The same machine as the NV200.
- Edward (EVR370) - Larger red vacuum with a 15-litre capacity that was also available in blue, green and yellow, now discontinued.
- James (JVC200) - An older version of James which had a metal body. Gray, originally introduced in 1985 without a rewinding cable, and looking more like Henry than the current model does, it was later rereleased with a rewinding cable in 1988 but is now discontinued.
- David (JVR225) - Green, introduced alongside George and another green vacuum with a 15-litre capacity called "William" in 1990 as model DVR200, now discontinued. William was a lower-cost version of Charles that did not last very long before it was also discontinued.
- Wendy (NVQ252B) - Numatic's first "female" vacuum cleaner. Green, introduced in 1997 (alongside the standard red NVQ250) as a Machine Mart exclusive, now discontinued.
- Bertie (PSP200A) - Orange, introduced in 2013 as a B&Q limited edition with a caddy top like that of James, now discontinued.
- John and Lewis (JL150) - Green and indigo, introduced in 2014 as a John Lewis & Partners limited edition, now discontinued.
- Jack (PSP200-11) - Blue, introduced in 2015 as a Tesco limited edition with a caddy top like that of James, now discontinued.
- Henry 35 (HVR235-11) - Introduced in 2016 as a limited edition to commemorate Henry's thirty-fifth anniversary, this Henry model was technically just a standard HVR200 that had been manufactured to replicate the appearance of an earlier one, and it is now discontinued.
- NV200, NV250, NRV200, NRV200T and NRV370 (secondary series) - All red in colour, these modelsNV200 was discontinued in 2007 at the same time as Basil (as they are the same machine), whilst NV250 was discontinued at the launch of NVQ-250, in ~1997.
- Numatic Turbo NVP200T - a Turbo version of the grey Numatic, available with an electric motorhead.
- Numatic Nuvac VNP180 - Introduced as a limited edition but widely produced from approximately 2010 - 2024, replaced with a faceless PPP180 all black recycled plastic model.
- Numatic Nuvac VNR200 - Introduced as a limited edition in grey similar to the NRV240 but without the mains on indicator light, widely produced and discontinued in early 2025, replaced by a smaller dust capacity part recycled machine with a plugged mains cable PPR170.
