= Fore Street (disambiguation) =

Fore Street is a common street name for the primary business street.

Fore Street also may refer to:

- Fore Street, Chard, England
- Fore Street, London, England
- Fore Street, Ipswich, England
- Fore Street (Portland, Maine), United States
- Fore Street Historic District
