= Henry (vacuum) =

Vacuum cleaner made by Numatic

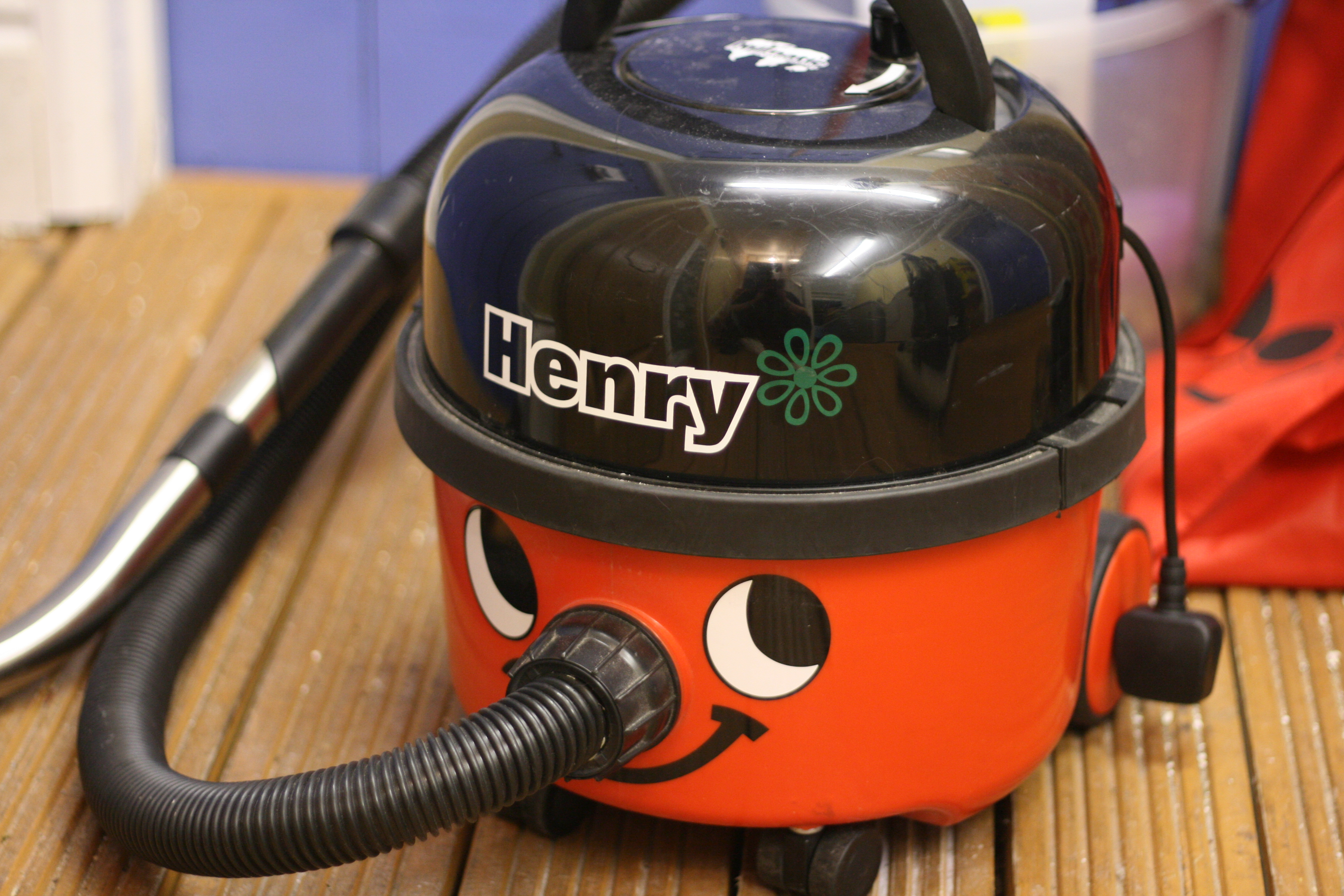
- A Henry vacuum cleaner (model HVR-200A)
- Type: Vacuum cleaner
- Inventor: Chris Duncan
- Inception: 30 May 1981; 45 years ago
- Manufacturer: Numatic International
- Available: Yes
- Models: HVR-160; HVR-240; HVB-160; HVX-200; HVR-160; HVR-200M; HVR-200A; HVA-160; HVW-370
- Website: www.myhenry.co.uk www.myhenry.co.za

Henry is a cylinder vacuum cleaner brand by Numatic International, and is the only mass-produced consumer vacuum cleaner still made in the United Kingdom. It is most notable for its cartoon eyes and mouth on its body, making a face.

The vacuum cleaner has several variations, including different names on the cap (including Hetty, Harry and James) as well as different models designed for different applications. The model was introduced in 1981.

== History ==
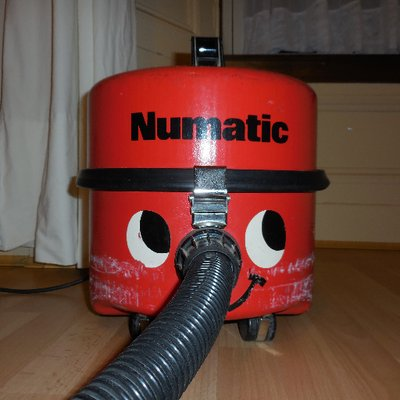
An early Numatic model

Chris Duncan launched Numatic in 1969, having seen a need for a rugged and reliable cleaner to clean the inside of boilers. He started with an oil drum, found a washing-up bowl that fitted on top, and ordered 5,000. The prototype is in the Numatic museum. The two-inch oil drum thread is still used for the Henry models' nose.

During a Lisbon trade show visit in the mid-1970s, Duncan and one of his sales-staff decided to dress up their latest Numatic model with a piece of ribbon and Union flag badge to resemble a hat. They drew a chalk smile under the hose outlet, and a pair of eyes over the hose, nicknaming the vacuum Henry. It was placed on their stand in a corner, amongst the other regular, un-decorated vacuums. The next day Duncan noticed an amused reaction from passers-by at the customised vacuum, which prompted him to ask his advertising specialist back home to design a more professional looking face for Henry.

In 1981 Henry became the first Numatic International model to have a name on its lid, which had become to look like a Bowler hat, replacing the 'Numatic' brand logo. Henry was also one of the first vacuums to use large-capacity microfibre dust bags known as HEPA-FLO bags, made of a material that retains dust and is stronger than the paper usually used, which can tear. In 2021 sales were increasing by a million units per year.

Henry's face was originally printed on the body, but in some markets a face is considered dangerous as it may encourage children to play with the device (although there have been no incidents), so it is now printed on a separate faceplate, installed in the factory for countries without restrictions, otherwise, to be attached by the buyer. The removable faceplate was introduced in late 2012, as well as the introduction of a parking bracket for the floor tool. Mid-2012 models came with the clips on the moulding to attach a 3D face whilst retaining the laminated face.

In 2014, still the company's sole owner, Duncan was listed at No. 96 on Management Today's Britain's Top 100 Entrepreneurs, and was said to have a worth of £103 million, estimated to have increased to about £150 million in 2021.

Numatic International also manufacture spray mops, sold under the Henry and Hetty brands as "Henry Spray Mop" and "Hetty Spray Mop".

Henrys were originally manufactured in Beaminster, Dorset, until Numatic moved production in 1990 to Chard, Somerset. Early Numatic and Henry models were all metal, this was later changed to plastic to reduce weight. Originally the components were manufactured by subcontractors and assembled by Numatic, but the company later began to manufacture most of its own components. Numatic now only sources components manufactured in the United Kingdom, which it advertises as part of its marketing.

== Model ==
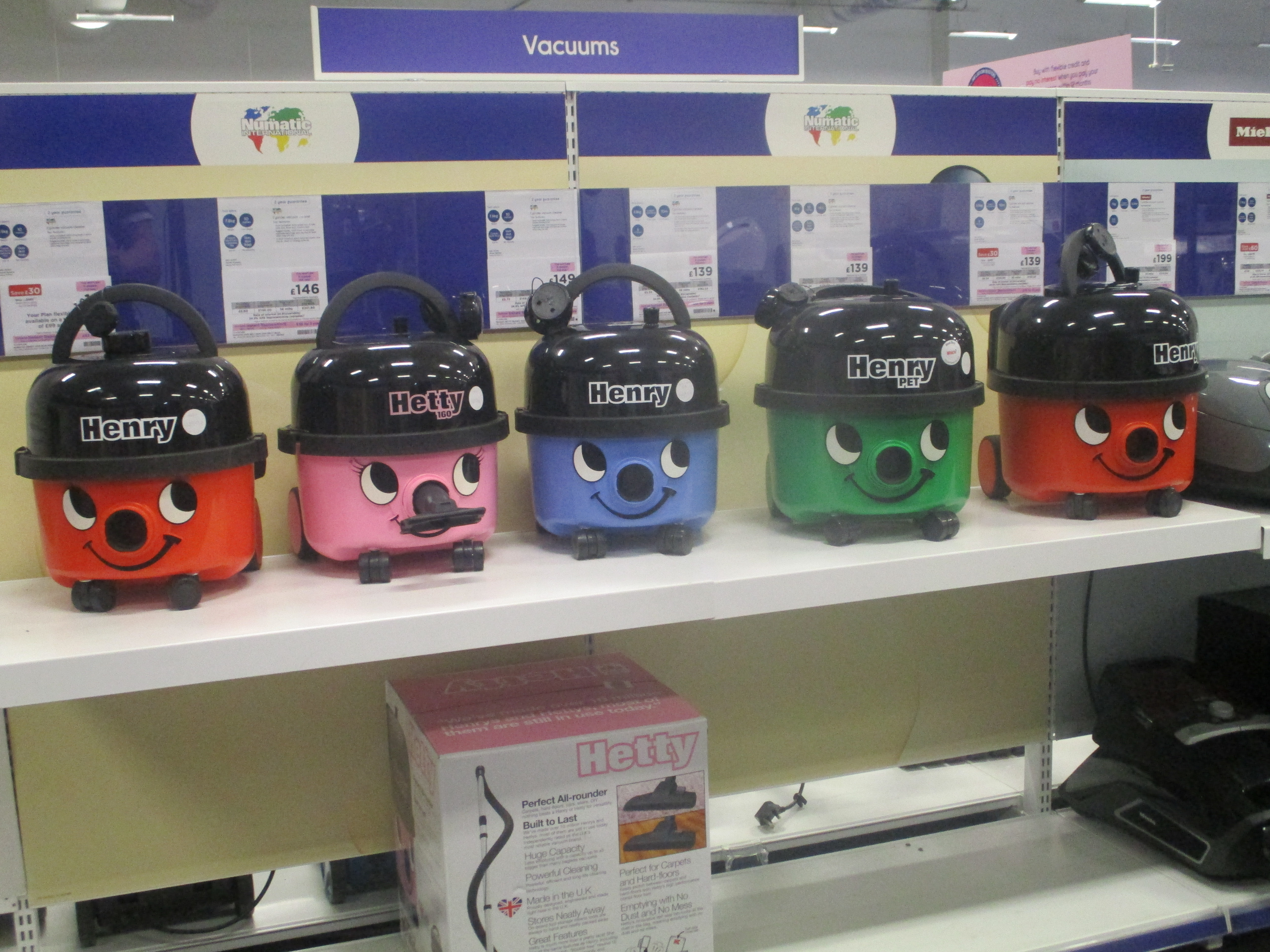
Various Henry models on display in Currys, Harrogate in 2022

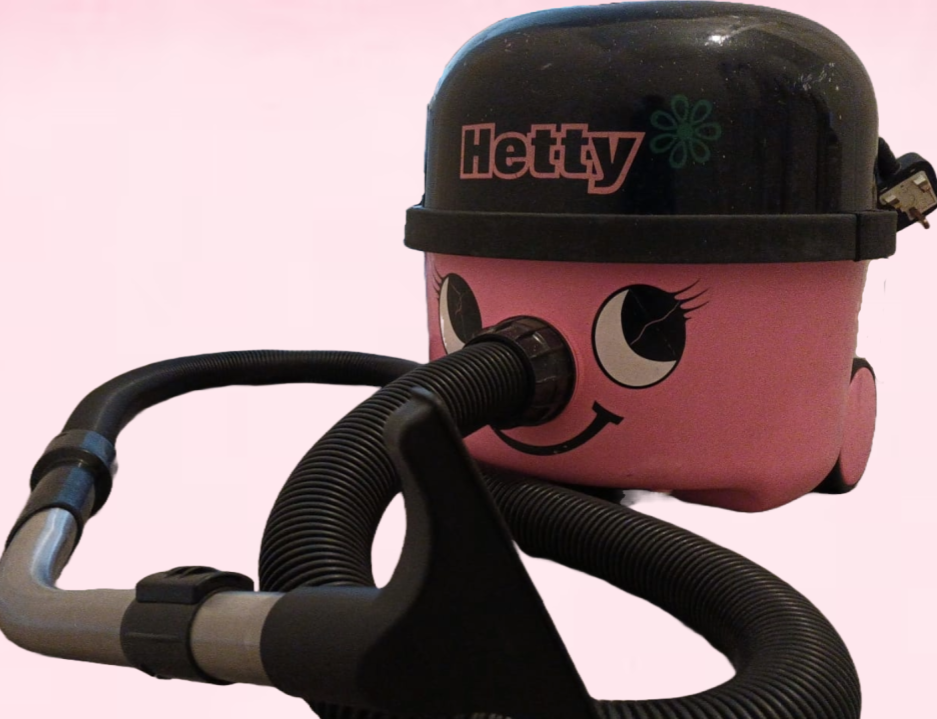
A Hetty HET 200A from 2009

- **Henry Quick Pro (HEN100)** - A cordless stick vacuum in grey with extra tools
- **Henry Quick Pet (HEN100)** - A cordless stick vacuum in blue with an extra tool for pet hair
- **Hetty Quick (HET100)** - A cordless stick vacuum in Hetty Pink
- **Henry Quick (HEN100)** - A cordless stick vacuum
- **Henry Professional (HVR240)** – A slightly larger version of the standard (9-litre) model for professional and retail applications.
- **Henry (and Hetty) Compact (HVR160 and HET160)** – Smaller and more compact versions of the standard Henry models, 6-litre capacity.
- **Henry Cordless (HVB160)** – A more compact version of the standard Henry model running off two 36-volt batteries, 6-litre capacity.
- **Henry Xtra (HVX160)** – A version of the standard (6-litre) Henry model designed for carpet care and cleaning pet hairs, with a selection of extra tools.
- **Henry Allergy (HVA160)** – A smaller, light blue version of the standard Henry model for capturing allergens, 6-litre capacity. The successor to the Henry Micro.
- **Henry Wash (HVW370)** – A larger, dark blue version unlike any one of the standard Henry models, carpet cleaner, 15-litre capacity.
- **Henry Plus HVR200P** – A John Lewis exclusive Henry, with a bigger tub and longer cable.

=== Old Models ===
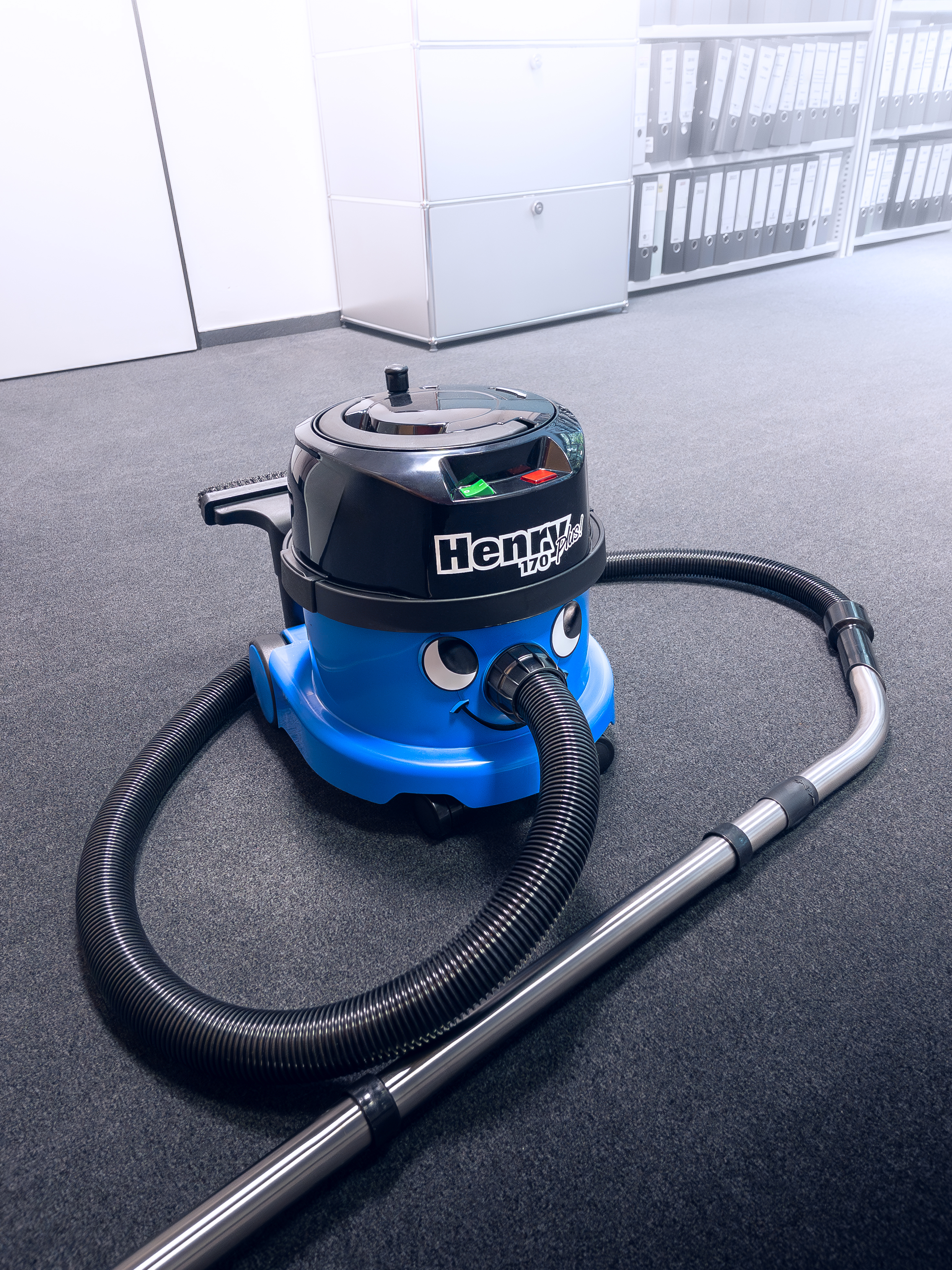
Henry plus! 170

=== Numatic ===
- **NV200** – Red, originally released without cord storage (rewind and cable hook). It was fully red with black latches, later changed to a red hat with a black furniture guard, then to a black hat with a red drum. **NV200** would later have two new additions, a cable hook and a PTO port. Ran from ~1982 and was discontinued ~2008, with little change to the design.
- **NV250**

=== Henry ===
- **Henry HVC200 -** Red, original released without cord storage. **HVC200** has a black motor hat and a red base. Early **HVC200**s did not have a PTO port and customers used a straight suction floor head or air drive turbine brush. **HVC200** ran from 1981 to 1987.
- **Henry HVR200** – Launched in 1987, **HVR200** is the successor to the popular **HVC200**, it incorporated a new way to store the cable, using a manual driven reel on the top of his hat. In 1988 Numatic did away with the 800W motor and introduced their 2-years-long-development' 1000W motor. **HVR200** was also now available in a new colour, beige / brown until 1991. In 1991 or 1992 Numatic mass-produced **Henry HVR200** in "Technicolour" (red, green, blue, and yellow) **Henry "HVR200"** ran from 1987 to 2004. From 1981 to 1988, Henry's name was stuck on with adhesive, in bold red and beige letters however this changed in late 1988 as Numatic started to print the names onto the hats which remains the current process. In late 1997 Henry's name would be outlined in Technicolour however this was changed in mid to late 1998 as his name would be outlined in white (1998–present). This was so Numatic didn't have four production lines, it also combated an issue which would occur when refurbishes didn't have a matching drum for Henry's hat. In late 1994 Numatic added a stabiliser to the back of Henry's drum so he wouldn't topple over when being pulled by the hose. In 1999, **Henry** no longer shipped with a PTO socket, thus eliminating the option to use a new **Henry** with a 100W Power Nozzle.
- **Henry Plus HVR200P** – The '90s equivalent to the Henry Micro, discontinued in 1999. The name is now used on John Lewis exclusives.
- **Henry HVR200-22** – The successor to the **HVR200,** this iteration of **Henry** came equipped with a two-speed PCB. Having the "Hi" setting enabled allowed the user to run Henry at 1200W, "Lo" would cut Henry's speed by 200W. By September 2006, Numatic updated the overall design of Henry's hat by adding two rocker switches to a power bank located on the top rear (oppose to the foot operated push button with a Hi-Lo rocker switch on the back above the furniture guard as seen with the Revision 1 **Henry HVR200-22**). **Henry HVR200-22** ran from 2004 to 2009/10. NVR200-22 machines were produced until 2015.
- **Henry HVR200A (AutoSave)** – Launched in mid 2008 to replace the 200-22 cleaners, Henry vacuums with the new "AutoSave Low Energy System" boasted reduced energy usage compared to its predecessors. The machines used a form of soft start system, where they would always start the motor on low power. The user would then have the option to switch to high power using the spring loaded "Hi" switch. The PCB fitted to enable the soft start system was problematic, suffering from failure due to carbon dust exposure, causing the vacuum to not start or run intermittently. The AutoSave model was the first to debut the clip-on face and a removable parking bracket for the floor tool in late 2012. The 200A series was discontinued in late 2014.
- **Henry HVR200-A2** – This iteration of Henry was introduced in June 2014 to comply with the EU Vacuum Regulations released in September of the same year. Marketed as the "HiFlo Range Low Energy System", These models used a twin fan motor setup similar to the previous 200A and 200-22 models, but were rated at a much lower 520W. As well as this, these models were single speed, ending a 10-year streak of Henry having a dual speed motor. They were discontinued at the start of 2015.
- **Henry HVR200-12 (HiFlo)** – Released in 2015 to replace the short lived 200-A2 models, the 200-12 (reusing the 200-A2's marketing as the HiFlo Range Low Energy System) used a single fan 620W motor, and unlike its predecessor, reintroduced the twin speed settings for the vacuum. They were discontinued in 2016, to make way for the HVR200-11, a single speed version with a revised bucket, which had tool and floor tool storage moulded on.
- **Sir Henry HVR200** – A limited edition Henry sold from the 1990s until the early 2000s.
- **Mr Henry HVR200** – The same as 'Sir Henry'.
- **Henry Micro HVR200M** – Launched at a similar time as 'Henry Xtra', Henry Micro featured a state-of-the-art filter, which retained allergens better than the standard Henry model. Ran from 2002 to 2022.
- **Henry Hound HHR200** – A Henry with an electric rotating brush, specialised for pet owners with a carbon filter. It came in green and was partially succeeded by Harry, (which used the same HHR200 model number) which has an air-driven turbine head.
- **Henry Turbo HVR200T** – The same as Henry Hound, just in red and without a carbon filter. This model was discontinued in 2014.

=== James ===
- **James JVC225** – released in 1985, James had the top half of a **Henry HVR200** and the bottom half of an **NV250**. Only available in grey, **James JVC225** had a cable hook to store the cable. Because of his robust nature, he was tailored to the commercial market. Production ran from 1985 to 1988.
- **James JVR225** – released in 1988, based on the original 1985 **James JVC225** model with the addition of a manual driven cord storage system, this iteration of **James** was also decked out with a new 1000W motor. **James JVR225** can also be found in red. **James JVR225** ran from 1987 to 1989.

=== Charles ===
- **Charles CVC375** – (1983 – 1989, succeeded by **Charles CVC370**)
- **Charles CVC370** – (1989 – 2004, succeeded by **Charles CVC370-2**)

=== Nuvac ===
- **Nuvac NVE3** –
- **Nuvac NNV200**
- **Nuvac NVNR200**
- **Nuvac VNP180**

=== George ===
- **George GVE370 -** **George** replaced **Nuvac NVE3**, the All in One Carpet Cleaner. Originally released with a plastic toolkit in 1989 and in green up until 1992, it was later changed to stainless steel.

=== David ===
- **David DVR200 -** David is essentially a cheaper **Henry HVR200**, his toolkit incorporated plastic wands oppose to stainless steel. **David DVR200** ran from 1989 to 1992.

=== William ===
- **William WVC370** – William is essentially a cheaper Charles, his toolkit incorporated plastic wands oppose to stainless steel.

=== Edward ===
- **Edward EVR370 -** Edward is essentially a **Henry HVR200** hat on a **Charles CVC370** Bucket. Originally released in red, Edward was later produced in yellow.

=== Names ===
The vacuums are also available with different names, which are shown on their caps. All the original series are based on English names. Vacuums with different names are generally of different colours and for different applications. Their faces remain identical on all models, except for Hetty, which has long eyelashes. Depending on the size of the head or body, the distance between the eyes and mouth can vary (excluding earlier models, as the faces were originally three stickers applied to the vacuums by hand).

- **Basil NB200** – Yellow, lower-cost version of Henry which was also available in red, blue and green. Its colour was later changed to lime green when it was re-released as a Halloween special edition on 10 July 2005, discontinued by the end of the year.
- **Edward EVR370** – Larger red vacuum with a 15-litre capacity that was also available in blue, green and yellow, now discontinued.
- **Charles CVC370** – Larger blue wet-and-dry vacuum with a 15-litre dry and a 9-litre wet capacity which was also available in red, green and yellow at one time. In the late 1980s, this model and some others were also manufactured in cream-and-brown.
- **George GVE370** – Larger green "all-in-one" vacuum with a 15-litre dry and a 9-litre wet capacity which was also available in red, blue and yellow at one time. On 14 August 2015 the Chancellor of the Exchequer, George Osborne, helped to make several blue instances of this model when he visited the Numatic International factory.
- **David DVR200** – Green, introduced alongside George and another green vacuum with a 15-litre capacity called "William" on 5 February 1990 as model DVR200, now discontinued. William was a lower-cost version of Charles, discontinued after a short time.
- **Wendy NV250** – Numatic's first "female" vacuum cleaner. Green, introduced on 3 January 1997 as a Machine Mart exclusive, now discontinued on 4 December 2020.
- **James JVP180** – Yellow, professional high performance vacuum with a caddy top and an 8-litre capacity. Originally introduced on 13 March 2002 as model NNV200 and coloured purple, it was re-released at a later date, and its colour was changed from yellow to blue on 7 April 2019.
- **Harry HHR200** – Green, originally released under the name of "Henry Hound" on 7 May 2003 and designed specifically for pet owners.
- **Hetty HET200** – Short for Henrietta, pink "feminine" version of Henry, introduced on 7 July 2007 to be marketed towards women. Her face is different from all the other models' in having long eyelashes.
- **B&Q Bertie and ScrewFix Bertie (PSP200A)** – Orange and Blue, introduced on 7 July 2013 as a B&Q and Screwfix limited edition with a caddy top like that of James, now discontinued on 14 November 2021.
- **John and Lewis (JL150)** – Green and Purple, introduced on 7 July 2014 as a John Lewis & Partners limited edition, now discontinued on 10 February 2022.
- **Jack (PSP200-11)** – Blue, introduced on 20 October 2015 as a Tesco limited edition with a caddy top like that of James, now discontinued on 14 March 2022.

Some Henry models with faces, such as the NBV190, are marked "Numatic" instead of "Henry" on the cap. Some Numatic cleaners, such as the WV370, while of similar appearance to the Henrys have no face and no personal name on their caps. A very few models have other words on their caps, such as "Micro-filter" on the MFQ370.
