= Ben Hamer =

English footballer (born 1987)

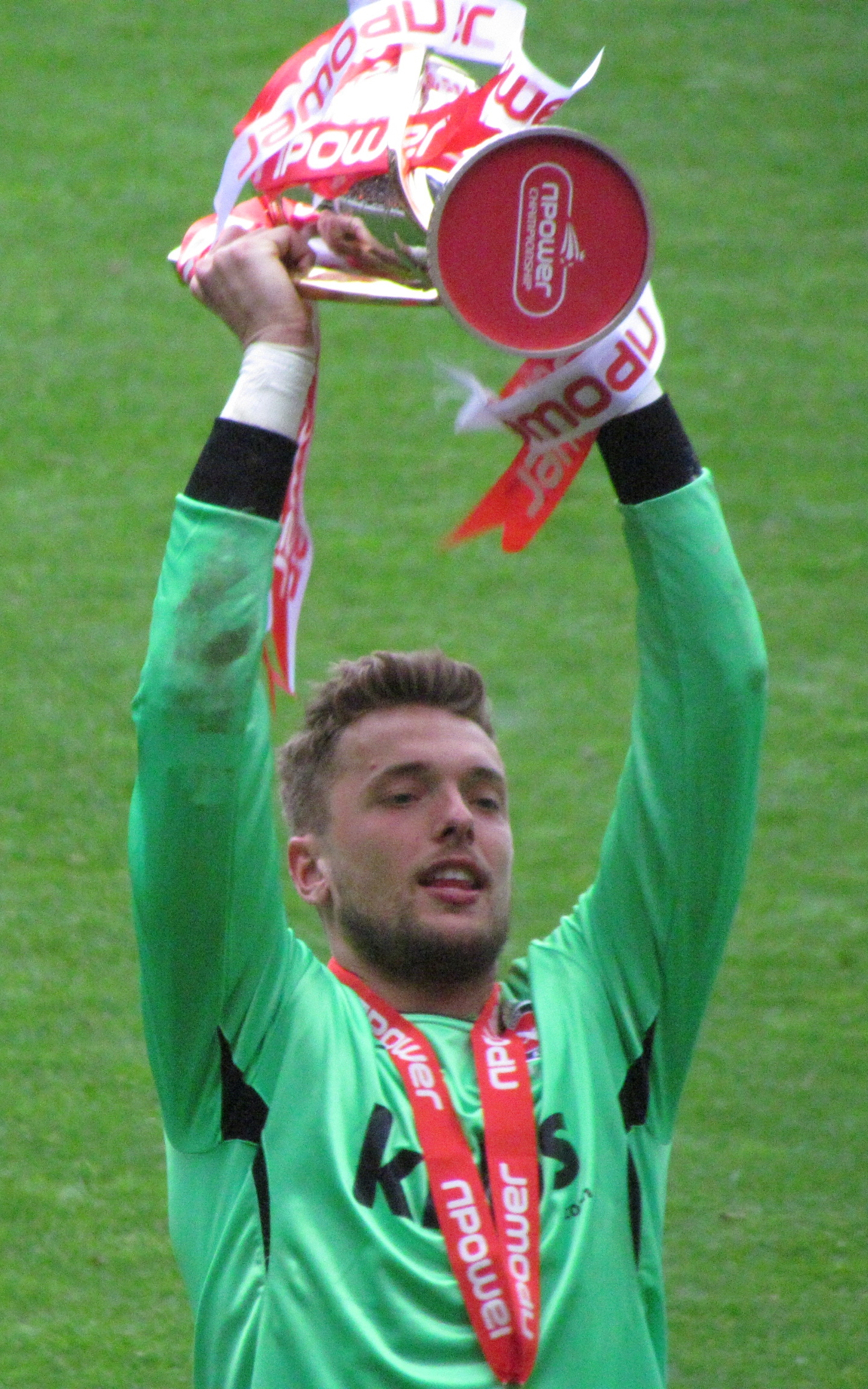
- Hamer celebrating winning the League One title with Charlton Athletic in 2012

Personal information
- Full name: Benjamin John Hamer
- Date of birth: 20 November 1987 (age 38)
- Place of birth: Chard, England
- Height: 6 ft 4 in (1.92 m)
- Position: Goalkeeper

Youth career
- 2004–2006: Reading

Senior career*
Years	Team	Apps	(Gls)
2006–2011	Reading	0	(0)
2006–2007	→ Crawley Town (loan)	45	(0)
2007–2008	→ Brentford (loan)	20	(0)
2008–2009	→ Brentford (loan)	45	(0)
2010–2011	→ Brentford (loan)	10	(0)
2011	→ Exeter City (loan)	18	(0)
2011–2014	Charlton Athletic	114	(0)
2014–2018	Leicester City	12	(0)
2015	→ Nottingham Forest (loan)	0	(0)
2015	→ Bristol City (loan)	4	(0)
2018–2021	Huddersfield Town	22	(0)
2019–2020	→ Derby County (loan)	25	(0)
2021–2022	Swansea City	21	(0)
2022–2024	Watford	20	(0)
2024–2025	Sheffield Wednesday	0	(0)
2025–2026	Queens Park Rangers	7	(0)
- * Club domestic league appearances and goals as of 17:41, 4 January 2026 (UTC)

Benjamin John Hamer (/ˈheɪmər/; born 20 November 1987) is an English professional footballer who plays as a goalkeeper.

== Career ==
=== Early career ===
Hamer was born in Chard, Somerset, and is a Bristol City fan. His family moved to Germany at the age of 3 and, consequently, he is a fluent German speaker. However, when he was 8, his family came back to England. He attended Holyrood Community School in Chard which is near to his birthplace. His footballing ability led to a spell playing for Somerset at county level, where he was spotted by a Reading scout. He signed for Reading at the age of 15.

=== Reading ===
==== Loan to Crawley Town FC ====
Having risen through the youth academy at Reading, Hamer went on loan to Crawley Town for the 2006–07 season, where he missed just one league game and was named as Player of the Season.

==== Loans to Brentford ====
On 4 July 2007, Hamer signed a new one-year contract to keep him at Reading until the end of the 2007–08 season. He joined Brentford in an initial one-month loan deal on 11 August 2007, which was subsequently extended to 14 October 2007. Brentford re-signed Hamer in an emergency loan deal on 1 January 2008, following an injury to their first choice 'keeper, Simon Brown. On 28 January 2008, his loan was extended to the end of the 2007–08 season.

He signed a new one-year deal with Reading and returned to Brentford for a third loan spell on a season-long loan on 17 June, and was Andy Scott's first choice goalkeeper for the 2008–09 season, in which Brentford were champions of League Two. As well as winning a League Two Champions medal, Hamer also won the Puma Golden Glove award for League 2 having recorded 20 clean sheets within the season.

On 18 June 2009, Hamer signed a new two-year contract and was expected to jostle with Adam Federici for the Number 1 jersey. On 31 August, Hamer was loaned back to Brentford for a fourth spell with the Bees.

==== Loan to Exeter City ====
On 18 January 2011, Hamer joined League One side Exeter City on a three-month loan deal. Hamer made his Exeter City debut against Walsall on 22 January 2011.

=== Charlton Athletic ===
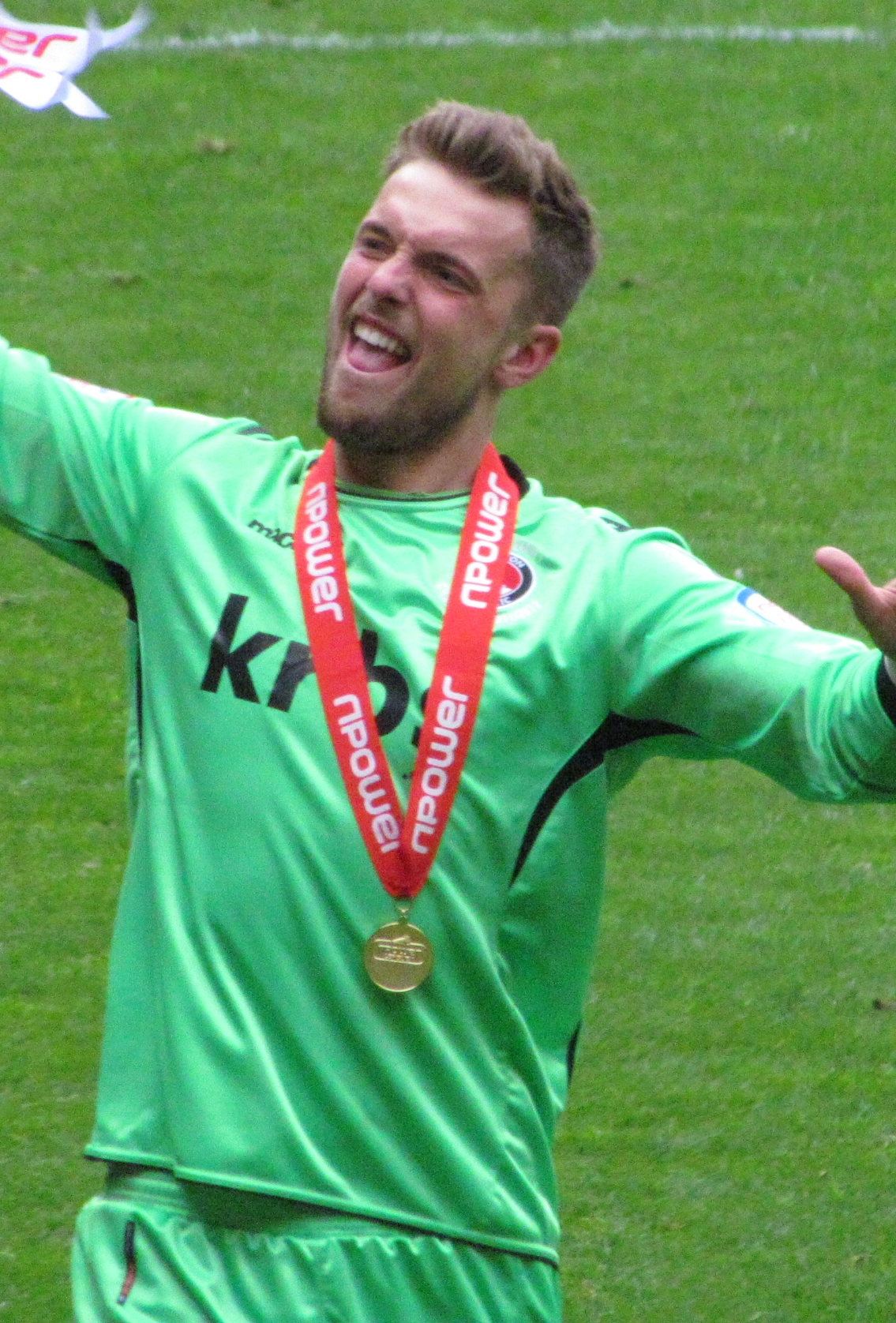
Hamer celebrating winning the League One title with Charlton Athletic in 2012

On 1 August 2011, Hamer joined Charlton Athletic on a three-year contract and was immediately handed the number one jersey. He made his debut on 23 August 2011 against his former club Reading in the League Cup first round and helped Charlton to a 2–1 win. After some initial nervous performances he cemented his place in the team, making crucial saves throughout Charlton's title winning League One campaign. He clinched promotion to the Championship with Chris Powell's side in April 2012, with a 1–0 win over Carlisle United and continued to play regularly for the Addicks during the 2012–13 season. A series of injuries resulted in Hamer playing fewer matches in the 2013–14 season.

=== Leicester City ===
After several weeks of strong speculation about Hamer's move to Leicester City, it was finally confirmed on 22 May 2014, by Hamer himself on social media. Hamer says he made the move to the newly promoted Foxes for the chance to play Premier League football. He made his debut in a 1–0 defeat at home to Shrewsbury Town in a League Cup second round tie. Following an injury to Kasper Schmeichel whilst on international duty, Hamer made his Premier League debut on 13 September, putting in a very good performance and keeping a clean sheet as Leicester secured a 1–0 win at Stoke City, their first victory since returning to the Premier League.

He played his second game for Leicester against Premier League champions, Manchester City in a 1–0 home defeat on 13 December. After playing 7 games for Leicester, Hamer lost his place when on 6 January 2015, Leicester signed experienced goalkeeper Mark Schwarzer from Chelsea to help cover for the injured Kasper Schmeichel. In the 2016–17 season, Hamer started Leicester's sixth Champions League group game, giving him his Champions League debut. Leicester lost 5–0 to FC Porto.

==== Loan to Nottingham Forest ====
On 25 July 2015, Hamer joined Championship side Nottingham Forest on a season-long loan deal. However, he returned to Leicester on 4 August after the loan was cut short due to Nottingham Forest's financial issues.

==== Loan to Bristol City ====
On 11 August 2015, Hamer joined Championship side Bristol City on season-long loan deal. However, he returned to Leicester City on 17 November 2015 after making only five appearances for the club.

=== Huddersfield Town ===
On 1 June 2018, Huddersfield Town announced the signing of Hamer on a free transfer once his contract ended on 1 July. Huddersfield fans were not impressed when Hamer was named number 1 for the 2020–21 season but his performances have won over the fans.

==== Derby County (loan) ====
On 8 August 2019, Hamer joined Derby County on loan for the 2019–20 season as back up for Kelle Roos. He made his debut and kept a clean sheet in a 1–0 win at Scunthorpe United in the EFL Cup first round. On 30 November 2019, Hamer made his league debut and thereafter became first choice keeper.

=== Swansea City ===
On 15 January 2021, Hamer completed a permanent move to Swansea City, for an undisclosed fee. He signed an 18-month contract.

=== Watford ===
On 19 July 2022, Hamer joined Watford on a free transfer, signing a two-year contract. He made his league debut for Watford in their 2–2 draw away to Coventry City on 10 April 2023, coming in for the suspended Daniel Bachmann.

On 23 May 2024, it was confirmed that Hamer would leave Watford following the expiry of his contract.

=== Sheffield Wednesday ===
On 14 June 2024, Sheffield Wednesday confirmed Hamer would be joining them after the expiration of his Watford contract. He was released from his contract following the end of the season having never played a game.

=== Queens Park Rangers ===
On 19 September 2025, Hamer joined Queens Park Rangers on a short-term contract. On 8 January 2026, he extended his short-term deal until the end of the season. On 5 May 2026 the club said the player would leave in the summer when his contract expired.

== Career statistics ==
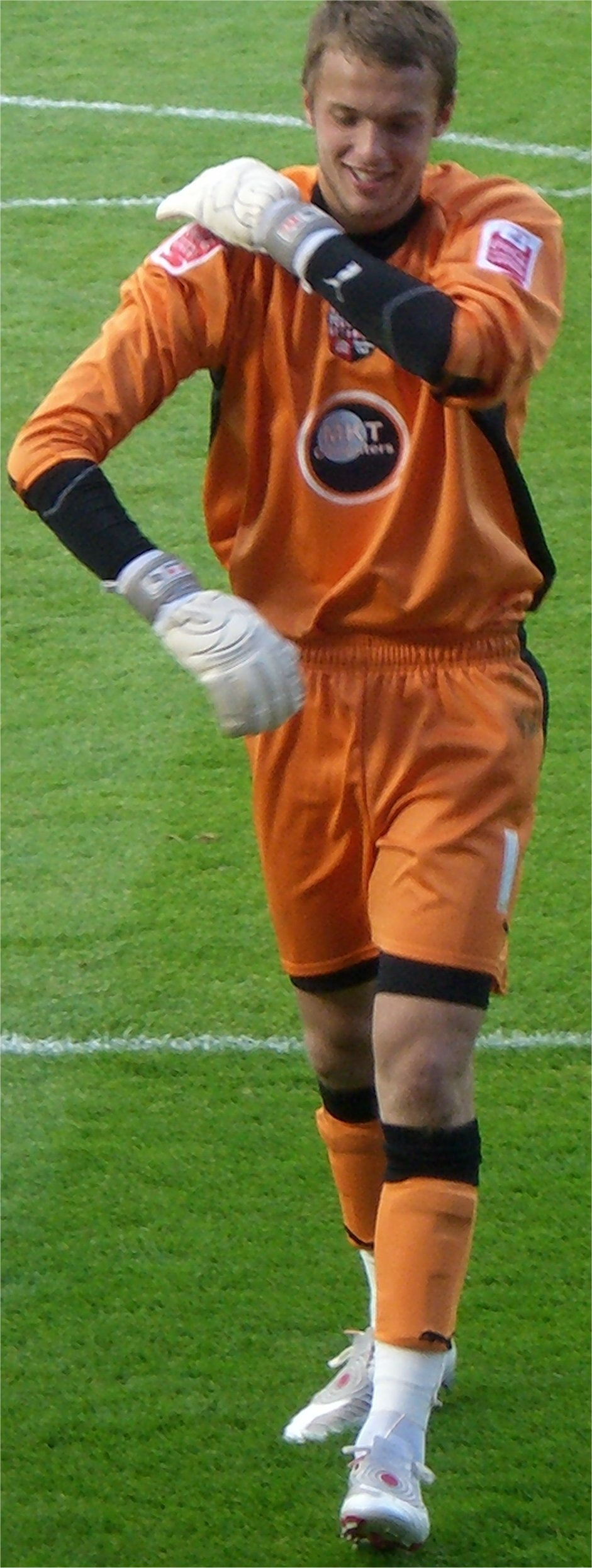
Hamer playing for Brentford in 2008

As of 4 January 2026

Appearances and goals by club, season and competitionClub statistics
Club	Season	League			FA Cup		League Cup		Other		Total	
Club	Season	Division	Apps	Goals	Apps	Goals	Apps	Goals	Apps	Goals	Apps	Goals
Reading	2006–07	Premier League	0	0	0	0	0	0	—		0	0
Reading	2007–08	Premier League	0	0	0	0	0	0	—		0	0
Reading	2008–09	Championship	0	0	0	0	0	0	0	0	0	0
Reading	2009–10	Championship	0	0	1	0	2	0	—		3	0
Reading	2010–11	Championship	0	0	0	0	2	0	0	0	2	0
Reading	Total		0	0	1	0	4	0	0	0	5	0
Crawley Town (loan)	2006–07	Conference National	45	0	1	0	—		1 (Note: Appearance in FA Trophy)	0	47	0
Brentford (loan)	2007–08	League Two	20	0	0	0	1	0	0	0	21	0
Brentford (loan)	2008–09	League Two	45	0	2	0	1	0	1 (Note: Appearance in the Football League Trophy)	0	49	0
Brentford (loan)	2010–11	League One	10	0	0	0	0	0	0	0	10	0
Brentford (loan)	Total		75	0	2	0	2	0	1	0	80	0
Exeter City (loan)	2010–11	League One	18	0	0	0	0	0	1	0	19	0
Charlton Athletic	2011–12	League One	41	0	0	0	1	0	0	0	42	0
Charlton Athletic	2012–13	Championship	41	0	0	0	1	0	—		42	0
Charlton Athletic	2013–14	Championship	32	0	3	0	2	0	—		37	0
Charlton Athletic	Total		114	0	3	0	4	0	0	0	121	0
Leicester City	2014–15	Premier League	8	0	1	0	1	0	—		10	0
Leicester City	2015–16	Premier League	0	0	0	0	0	0	—		0	0
Leicester City	2016–17	Premier League	0	0	0	0	0	0	1 (Note: Appearance in UEFA Champions League)	0	1	0
Leicester City	2017–18	Premier League	4	0	1	0	4	0	—		9	0
Leicester City	Total		12	0	2	0	5	0	1	0	20	0
Nottingham Forest (loan)	2015–16	Championship	0	0	0	0	0	0	—		0	0
Bristol City (loan)	2015–16	Championship	4	0	0	0	1	0	—		5	0
Huddersfield Town	2018–19	Premier League	7	0	1	0	0	0	—		8	0
Huddersfield Town	2019–20	Championship	0	0	0	0	0	0	—		0	0
Huddersfield Town	2020–21	Championship	15	0	1	0	1	0	—		17	0
Huddersfield Town	Total		22	0	2	0	1	0	0	0	25	0
Derby County (loan)	2019–20	Championship	25	0	0	0	2	0	—		27	0
Swansea City	2020–21	Championship	0	0	—		—		0	0	0	0
Swansea City	2021–22	Championship	21	0	1	0	1	0	—		23	0
Swansea City	Total		21	0	1	0	1	0	0	0	23	0
Watford	2022–23	Championship	1	0	0	0	0	0	—		1	0
Watford	2023–24	Championship	19	0	1	0	1	0	—		21	0
Watford	Total		20	0	1	0	1	0	0	0	22	0
Sheffield Wednesday	2024–25	Championship	0	0	0	0	0	0	—		0	0
Queens Park Rangers	2025–26	Championship	7	0	0	0	0	0	—		7	0
Career total			363	0	13	0	21	0	4	0	401	0

== Honours ==
Brentford

- Football League Two: 2008–09

Charlton Athletic

- Football League One: 2011–12

Individual

- PFA Team of the Year: 2011–12 League One
- Football League Two Golden Glove: 2008–09
