= Church of St Mary the Virgin, Chard =

Church in Somerset, England

Church of St Mary the Virgin
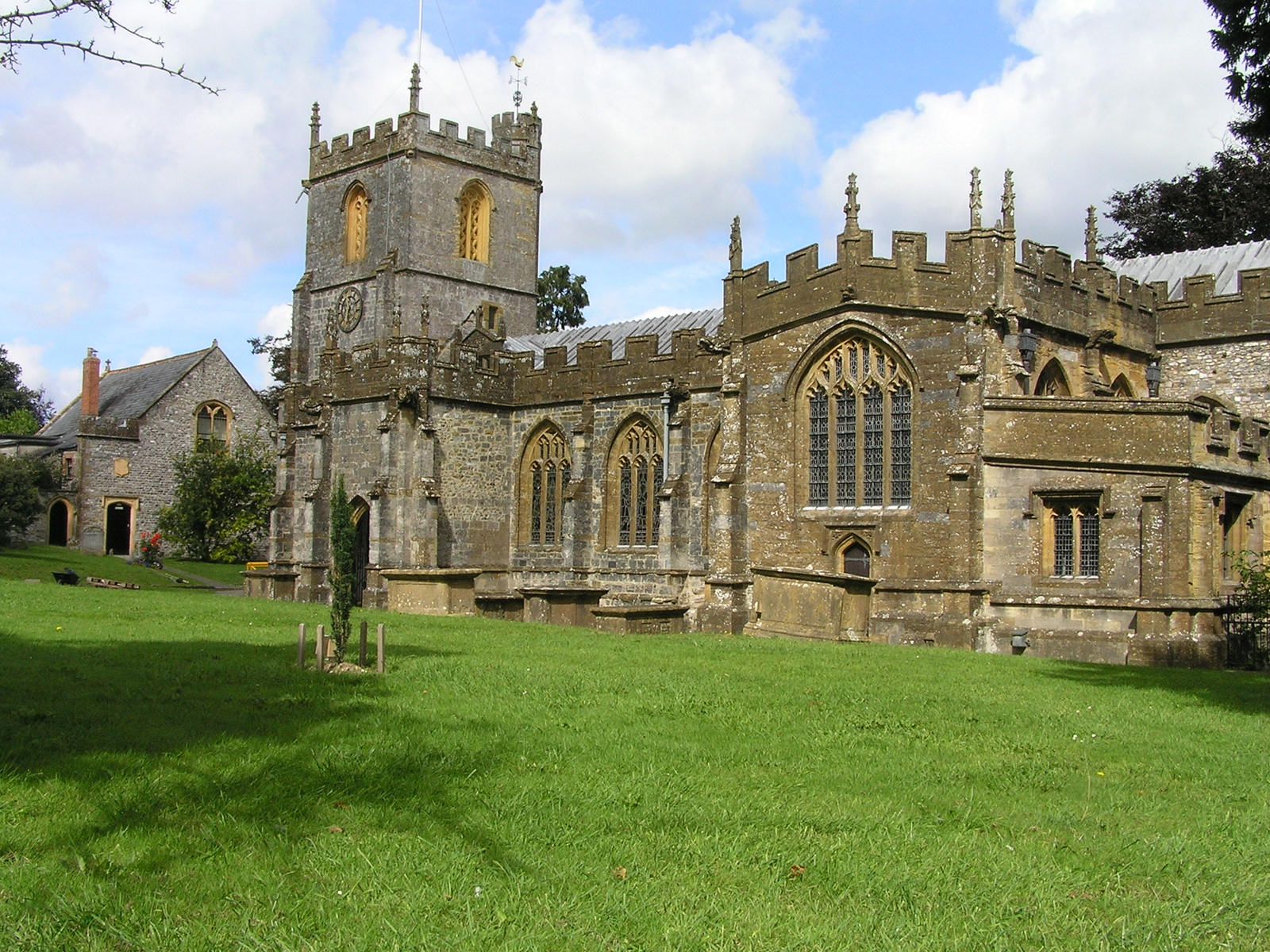

- Location within Somerset
- 50°52′09″N 2°57′48″W
- Location: Chard, Somerset, England

History
- Built: 11th century

Listed Building – Grade I
- Official name: Church of St Mary the Virgin
- Designated: 24 March 1950
- Reference no.: 1297140

The Anglican Church of St Mary the Virgin in Chard, Somerset, England dates from the late 11th century and was rebuilt in the 15th century. It has been designated as a Grade I listed building. Due to the effects of a leak in the roof it was added to the Heritage at Risk Register in 2013.

The Perpendicular cruciform church has an aisled nave and north and south porches. The north transept has an oak roof, which was refurbished in 1975. The south transept contains the organ, built in 1883. The church used to have galleries. The Fawcus chapel in the north aisle, dedicated to a local physician, includes the Brewer Memorial .

The west tower was built between 1505 and 1520 and contains a peal of eight bells, of which two were made in the 1790s by Thomas Bilbie of the Bilbie family in Cullompton. The three-stage tower has moulded string courses and an angle stair turret in the north-west corner. The clock chimes each quarter-hour in a setting often known as Chard Chimes.

There is a church room built in 1827.

The parish is part of the benefice of Chard, St. Mary with Combe St Nicholas, Wambrook and Whitestaunton within the deanery of Crewkerne and Ilminster.

== See also ==
- Grade I listed buildings in South Somerset
- List of Somerset towers
- List of ecclesiastical parishes in the Diocese of Bath and Wells
