= Snowdon Hill Quarry =

Geological Site of Special Scientific Interest in Somerset, England

- Site of Special Scientific Interest
- Location within Somerset
- Location of Snowdon Hill Quarry.
- Area of search: Somerset
- Grid reference: ST312089
- Coordinates: 50.87548°N 2.97922°W
- Interest: Geological
- Area: 0.6 hectares (0.0060 km^{2}; 0.0023 sq mi)
- Notification date: 1963

Snowdon Hill Quarry (grid reference ST312089) is a 0.6 hectare geological Site of Special Scientific Interest on the western outskirts of Chard in Somerset, notified in 1963.

The site shows rock exposures through the Upper Greensand and Chalk which contain fossil crustaceans which are both unique and exceptionally well-preserved and support study of palaeontology in Britain. The unit has been dated to the subdivision of the Chalk known as the Turrilites acutus Zone, named after one of the characteristic fossils.
