= The Guildhall, Chard =

Municipal building in Chard, Somerset, England

The Guildhall
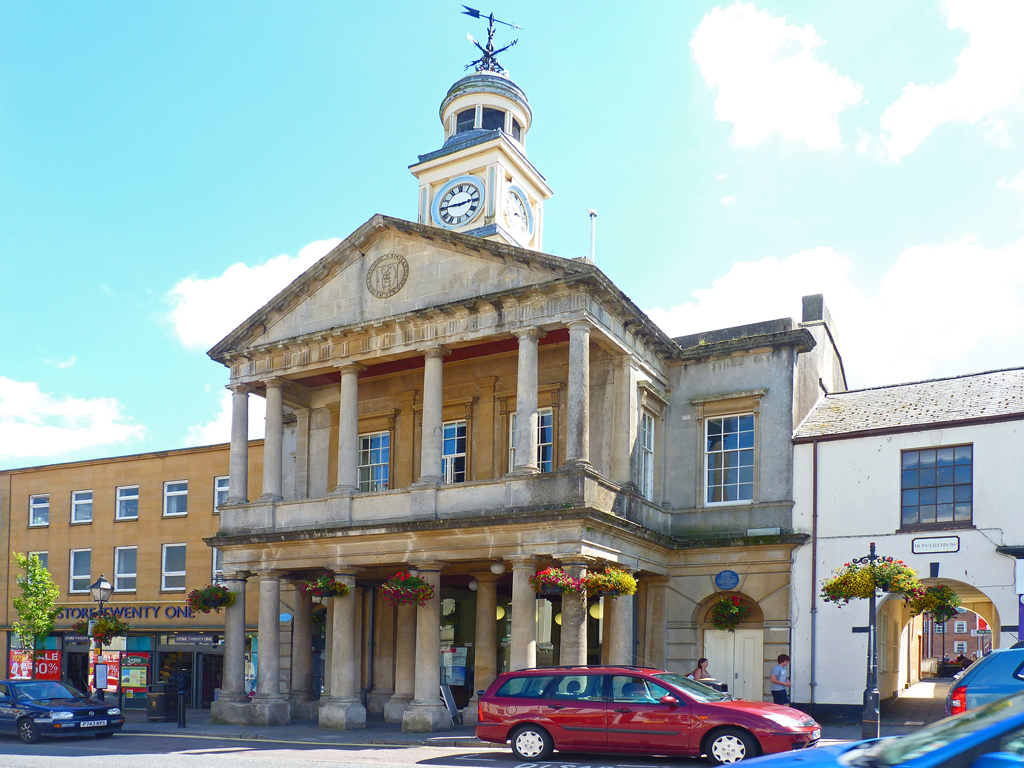
- The Guildhall in 2013

- Location within Somerset
- 50.8725°N 2.9646°W
- Location: Chard, Somerset, England

History
- Built: 1834-35

Site notes
- Architect: Richard Carver
- Architectural style: Classical style

Listed Building – Grade II*
- Official name: The Guildhall
- Designated: 24 March 1950
- Reference no.: 1197456

The Guildhall is a town hall and community building in the town of Chard in the English county of Somerset.

== History ==
The Guildhall was built between 1834 and 1835 to replace the town's original 16th century guildhall and market house. Owing to the inconvenient position of the original hall at Fore Street, the decision to erect a replacement was finalised in 1833. The foundation stone of the new hall was laid on 20 December 1834. Designed by the local architect Richard Carver of Taunton in the Classical style, it originally incorporated a town hall, market house and butchery, and cost over £3,000 to build. The building, which also served as the local corn exchange, first opened on 21 September 1835.

The guildhall clock was manufactured by A. Payne, and installed to celebrate the accession of Queen Victoria to the throne in 1837; it strikes the hours and chimes the quarters on two bells. The building has been Grade II* listed since 1950.

Much of the building's interior was remodelled around 1970, with the entire building later undergoing renovation work between 1998 and 2003. The weather vane on top of the building, which is 7 feet (2.1 m) high and weighs 32 stone (450 lb; 200 kg) was taken down for restoration by a local blacksmith in spring 2002.

The guildhall was the meeting place of the municipal borough of Chard, formed in response to the Municipal Corporations Act 1835. It ceased to be the local seat of government when, following further local government re-organisation, the enlarged South Somerset Council was formed in 1974. The Guildhall has housed the offices of Chard Town Council since 2009, and is also regularly used by local community groups for a variety of activities.

The mechanism for the guildhall clock, weighing 200 kilograms (440 lb), was removed during the renovation of the building and returned, fully restored, in spring 2008.

== Architecture ==
The Guildhall is built of Hamstone sourced from nearby Ham Hill, with slate roofs. The two-storey building has a T-shaped plan and is designed in the Classical style. The facade features a Doric portico with a double row of Tuscan columns at ground level and Doric columns on the second-storey. A domed cupola, featuring clock faces on three sides, sits on top of the facade's pediment. Both the council chamber and mayor's parlour survive unaltered.
