= Holyrood Academy =

Location
- Zembard Lane; Chard, Somerset, TA20 1JL; England; 50.8762°N 2.9636°W

Information
- Type: Academy
- Motto: Apud nos suspectum
- Established: 1 September 2010
- Department for Education URN: 136295 Tables
- Ofsted: Reports
- Head teacher: Dave MacCormick
- Gender: Mixed
- Age: 11 to 18
- Enrolment: 1,319 as of 2024
- Houses: Stringfellow, Bonfield, Denslow and Gillingham
- Colours: Gold, Black and Red
- Website: https://holyrood.bep.ac/

Holyrood Academy, previously known as Holyrood Community School before September 2010, is a secondary school with academy status in Chard, Somerset, England. From April 2017 to August 2019 it was part of the Vector Learning Trust, a Multi Academy Trust which also included the nearby Axe Valley Academy in Axminster.

In September 2019, both Holyrood and Axe Valley joined the Uffculme Academy Trust.

In September 2023, both Holyrood and Axe Valley joined the Blackdown Education Partnership.

The school has existed from 1910, previously being referred to as "Holyrood Secondary Modern School", "Holyrood Secondary School", "Holyrood Comprehensive School" and "Holyrood Community School".

As of 2019, Holyrood Academy has 1,276 pupils between the ages of 11 and 18, 100 teachers, 23 teaching assistants and 37 support staff.

Students are taught for 25 lessons a week, each is 60 minutes long. In addition, students have a daily tutorial period (20 minutes).

Holyrood Academy also has a sixth form on campus offering BTEC and A level courses to 16-18 year olds.

== History ==
The school was founded in 1910, after Southend School moved site and renamed to Holyrood School. The first headmaster was Mr Harry Bennett.

== Notable students ==
Ben Hamer, English footballer
