= Fore Street, Chard =

Main street of Chard, England

Fore Street
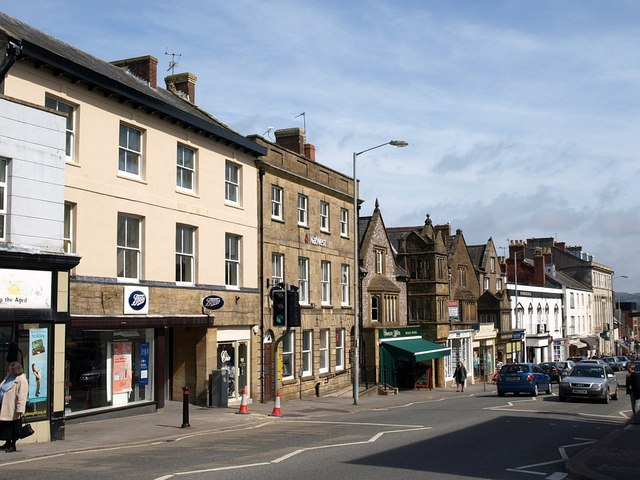

- Location within Somerset
- 50°52′21″N 2°57′51″W
- Location: Chard, Somerset, England

History
- Built: Late 16th and early 17th century

Listed Building – Grade I
- Official name: Waterloo House and Manor Court House
- Designated: 24 March 1975
- Reference no.: 1197449

Fore Street in Chard, Somerset, England was built in the late 16th and early 17th century, following a fire which destroyed much of the town in 1577.

Fore Street is a main shopping street and thoroughfare with open water channels on either side. Local folklore claims that one stream eventually flows into the Bristol Channel and the other reaches the English Channel. This situation changed when the tributary of the Axe was diverted into the Isle; the gutter in Holyrood Street, though, still flows into the River Axe and therefore it is still true it lies on the watershed and that two gutters eventually drain into the Bristol Channel and the English Channel.

Numbers 7A,7B,9,11,13 & 13A Waterloo House and Manor Court House have been designated as Grade I listed buildings. They are now on the Heritage at Risk Register. The Hamstone Waterloo House and Manor Court House were built in the late 16th or early 17th century. The history of the buildings is complex and not fully understood, although it is known that it was used as a court house at various periods. Worries about the condition of the buildings, and others in the row from 7 to 13 Fore Street, and the need for their preservation. has been expressed throughout the 20th century.

In 2010 when the Manor Court House, where Charles I signed a peace declaration during the English Civil War, was added to the Heritage at Risk Register one local trader complained that not enough was being done to maintain and conserve the building. Waterloo Court was built in the 16th century as a house, it has since been converted into a shop with a flat above it.

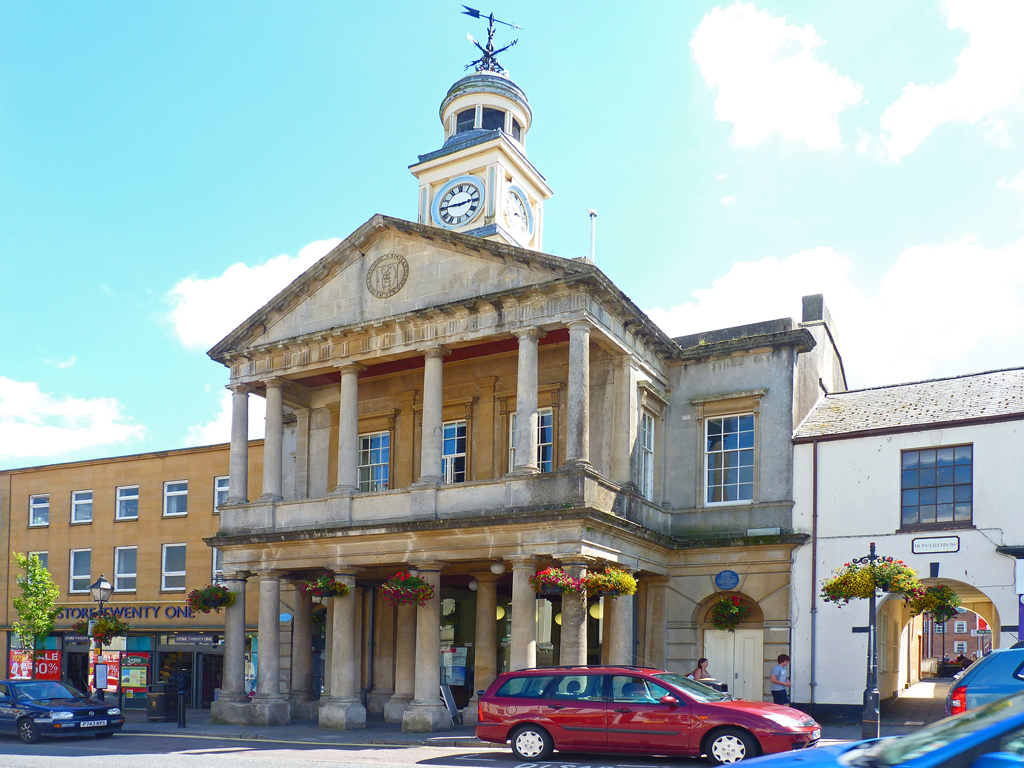
The Guildhall

In 1834 the Guildhall was built with a doric portico with a double row of Tuscan columns along the front. It was built to replace an earlier 16th century guildhall and now serves as the town hall.

Chard Museum is housed in a 16th-century thatched building which was originally four cottages. The building was converted and restored for use as a museum in 1970, and later incorporated the building next door which had been the New Inn public house. It houses collections of exhibits about local history and displays related to the lives of notable local residents.

The L-shaped school building was built in 1583 as a private house and converted into Chard Grammar School in 1671. It was damaged in the fire if 1727. It is a Grade II* listed building. In 1890 it became a boarding school and then in 1972 a preparatory school. Monmouth House, which was built between 1770 and 1790, and the 16th century chapel, are also now part of the school.

Pubs include the Dolphin Inn, which was built in 1840 and the George Hotel which was constructed in the late 18th century. The Wesleyan Methodist Chapel was built in 1895 from Flemish bond brick.

The branch of Lloyds Bank was built as a house on the site of the Chard Arms Hotel in 1849. The branch of National Westminster Bank was two houses when it was constructed around 1820. In 1938 a bomb proof bunker was built behind the branch of the Westminster Bank. During World War II it was used to hold duplicate copies of the bank records in case its headquarters in London was destroyed. It was also used to store the emergency bank note supply of the Bank of England. There has also been speculation that the Crown Jewels were also stored there, however this has never been confirmed.

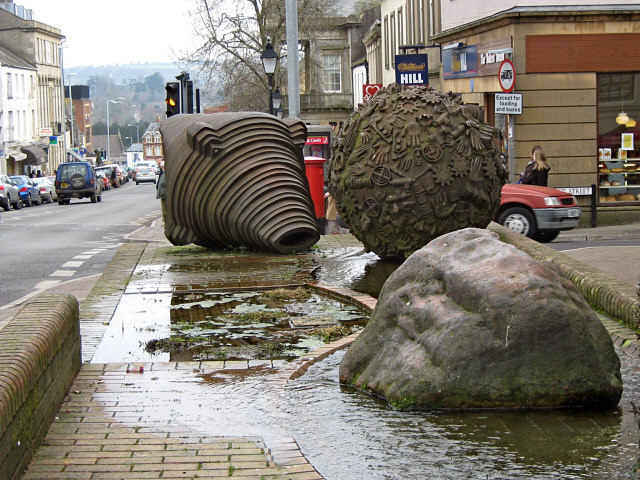
Bronze sculptures by Neville Gabie

In 1991 the town council commissioned bronze sculpture from Neville Gabie which were erected in Fore Street they are entitled Ball and Whirl. An album detailing the work and its commissioning is held by the Chard Museum.

== See also ==
- List of Grade I listed buildings in South Somerset
