= Numatic International =

British appliance manufacturer

Numatic International Limited
- Formerly: Compact Air Heating Limited (1963–1967); Nu-matic Engineering Limited (1967–1980)
- Type: Private Limited Company
- Industry: Major appliance
- Founded: 9 September 1963; 62 years ago
- Founder: Chris Duncan
- Headquarters: Chard, Somerset, England, United Kingdom
- Key people: Chris Duncan (Chairman and Founder); Stuart Cochrane (Manufacturing Manager)
- Products: Vacuum cleaners and other cleaning equipment (Henry)
- Revenue: ▲GB £234.6 million (2023)
- Net income: ▲GB £10 million (2013)
- Number of employees: 1,000 (2017)
- Website: numatic.co.uk

Numatic International Limited is a British manufacturer primarily producing domestic, commercial and industrial cleaning and maintenance equipment distributed worldwide. It is one of the major producers of vacuum cleaners in the United Kingdom, producing the Henry domestic vacuum cleaner and its related models, which also shares a canister design with the "smiling face" appearance and human name.

The company was founded on 9 September 1963, and as of 2024 is owned solely by Chairman and Founder Chris Duncan, who created the compact shape for the cleaner. The company owns a manufacturing facility in Chard, Somerset, South West England, and eight subsidiary companies located in France, South Africa, Germany, The Netherlands, Switzerland, Portugal, Spain and Italy. In 2017, the company employed over 1,000 people and produced 4,500 units per day, over 40% of which were exported.

== Founding ==
Chris Duncan launched Numatic in 1969, having spotted a gap in the market for a device to clean coal and gas-fired boilers. He started with an oil drum, found a washing-up bowl that fitted on top, and ordered 5,000. The prototype is in the Numatic museum. The two-inch oil drum thread is still used for the later Henry models' nose.

One evening during a trade show in the mid-1970s, Duncan and a salesman, bored, dressed up one of their current commercial cleaners with ribbon, a union flag badge, and something like a hat, then chalked a crude smile under the hose connector. The next day, visitors noticed it and laughed; Duncan then decided to ask his advertising people to design a proper face; they nicknamed the result "Henry". At another trade show, a children's hospital was interested in the vacuum cleaners to encourage the recovering children to help with the cleaning. Production, still focused on the commercial market, was increased. The Henry models became the company's major product.

== Domestic vacuums (Henry) ==
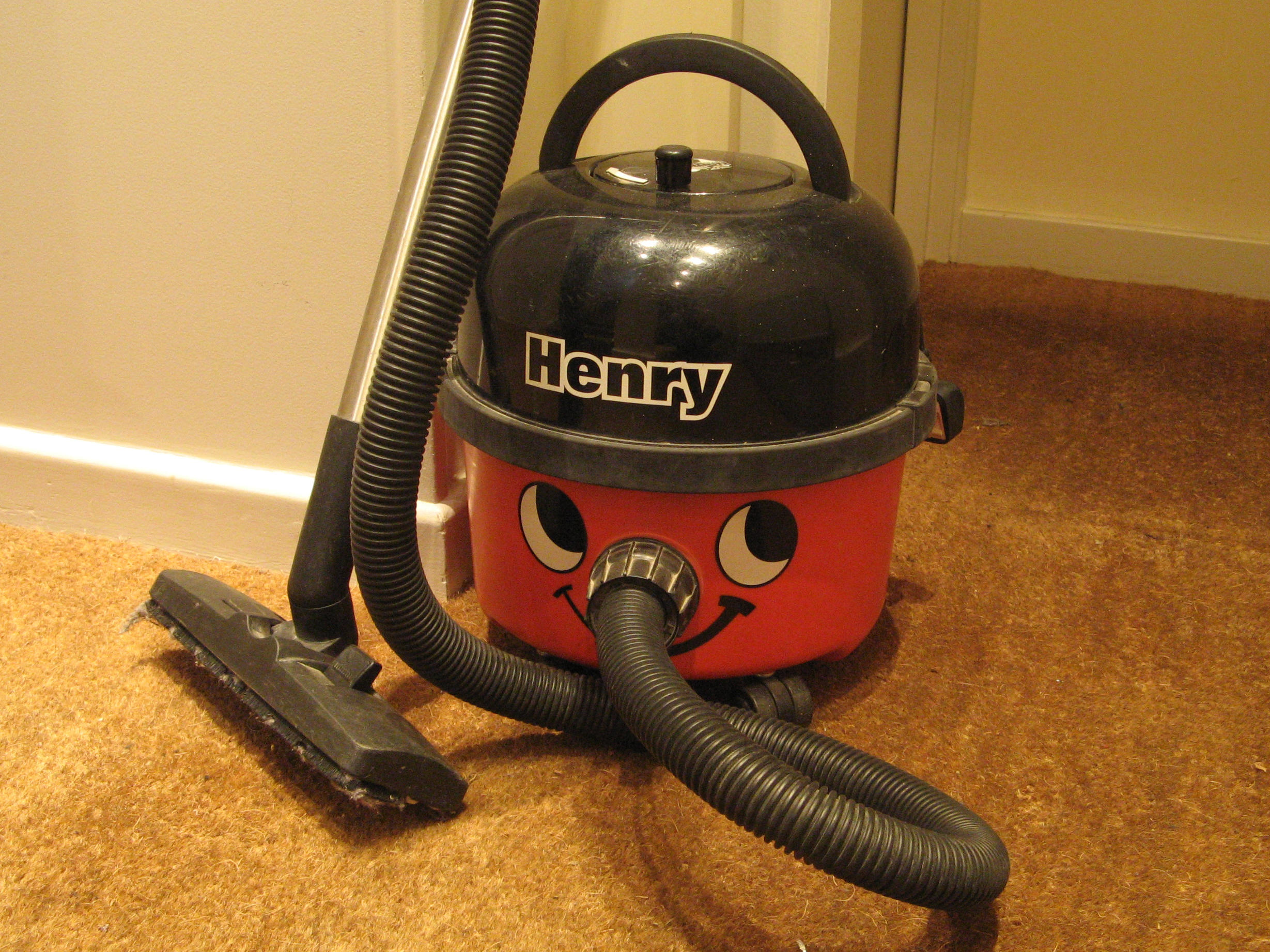
A Henry HVR200-22 from 2007-2008.

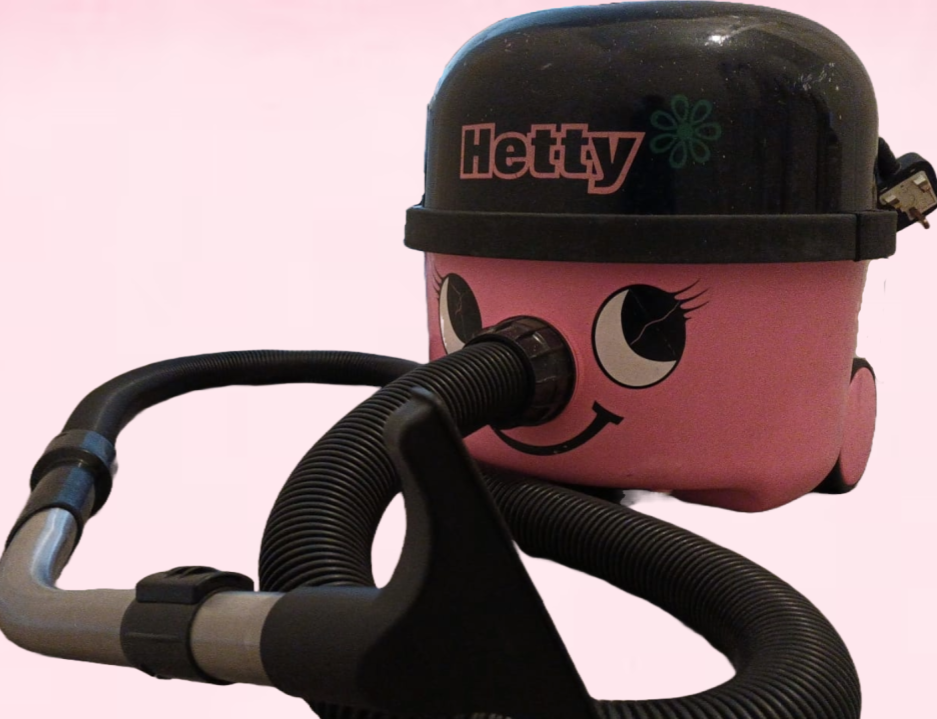
A Hetty HET200A from 2009.

One of Numatic's most popular products is the Henry canister vacuum cleaner. It has a large smiling face on the front of the canister, with the vacuum's hose connector or hose (if fitted) forming its nose. The face was originally three stickers that had to be applied to the canister, but the face was then applied directly to the body, and later replaced by a 3D clip-on face which is fitted by the user in regions where a factory-fitted face is considered a dangerous risk encouraging children to play with the device. A new parking bracket was added in September 2012. Since the introduction of Henry in 1981, more than 14 million Henry vacuums have been made. Henry, along with his pink counterpart Hetty, now have merchandise based on them (such as plush toys and T-shirts). There are also Henry desktop cleaners for cleaning desks and tables, which are neither made nor sold by Numatic International, but by Paladone Products.

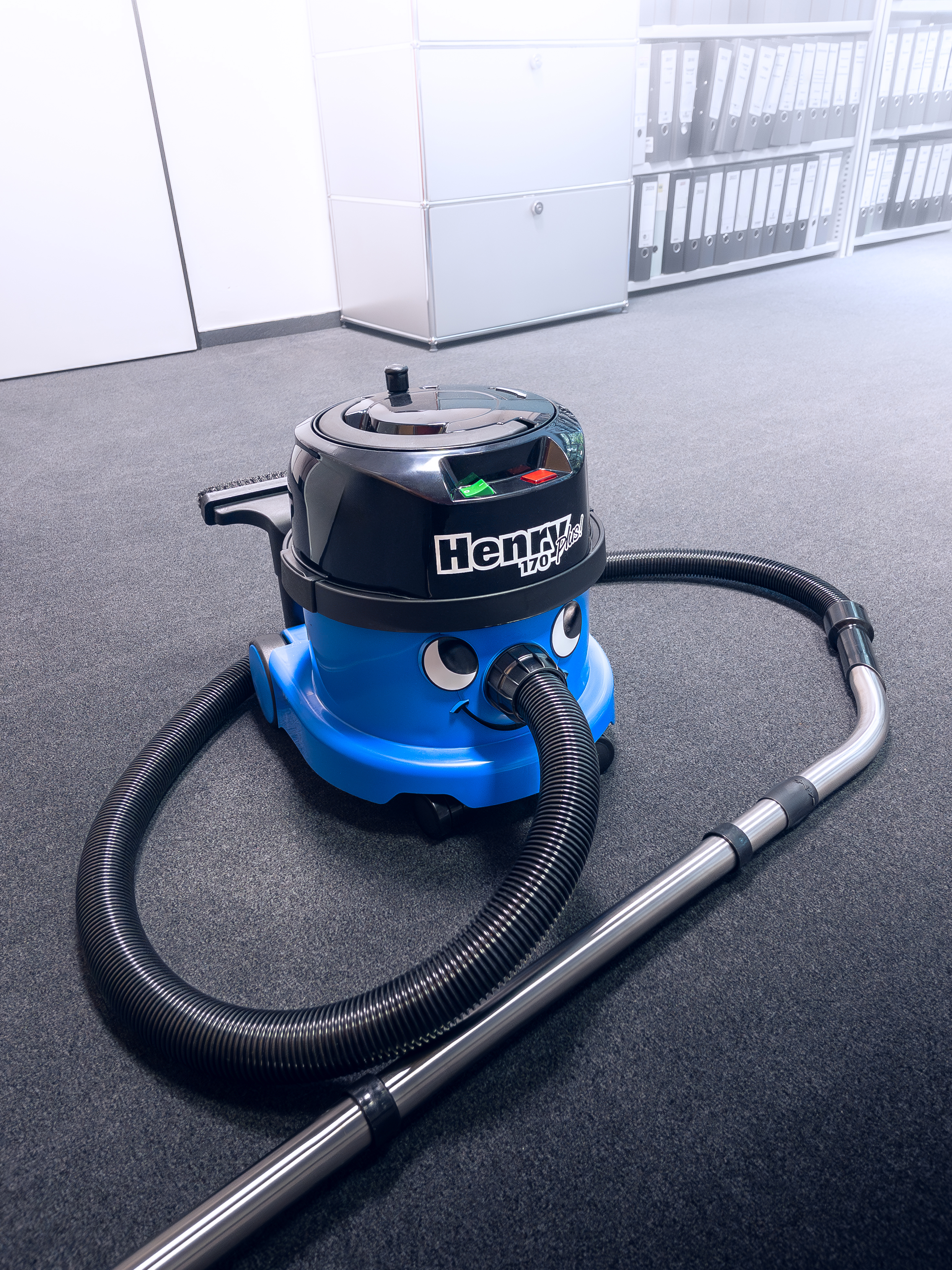
Henry plus! 170

Henry has a number of models, such as the Henry Cordless (which is run off chargeable batteries), the Henry Micro (which reduces exposure to allergens), and the Henry Xtra (which is made specifically for carpets and cleaning pet hair). Henry also has many variations of the name that is on the vacuum, such as Hetty (which is pink, has long eyelashes, and leans towards a female target market), Harry (which is green, was originally called Henry Hound, and leans towards pet owners), James (which was originally yellow, but its colour was changed to blue in 2019, and has a caddy top), and many others. Henry is most prominent in the United Kingdom where it is manufactured, but it can be purchased in other countries. Since Henry's original release in 1981, a family of vacuum cleaners have been introduced in different sizes and colours with different specifications and uses (including a wet and dry model and a multi-functional wet/dry and carpet shampoo cleaner). All the original series, some of which have now been discontinued, are based on British names, such as Basil, Edward, Charles and George.
