= Chard, Somerset =

Town in Somerset, England

Coordinates: 50.8728°N 2.9587°W

Chard
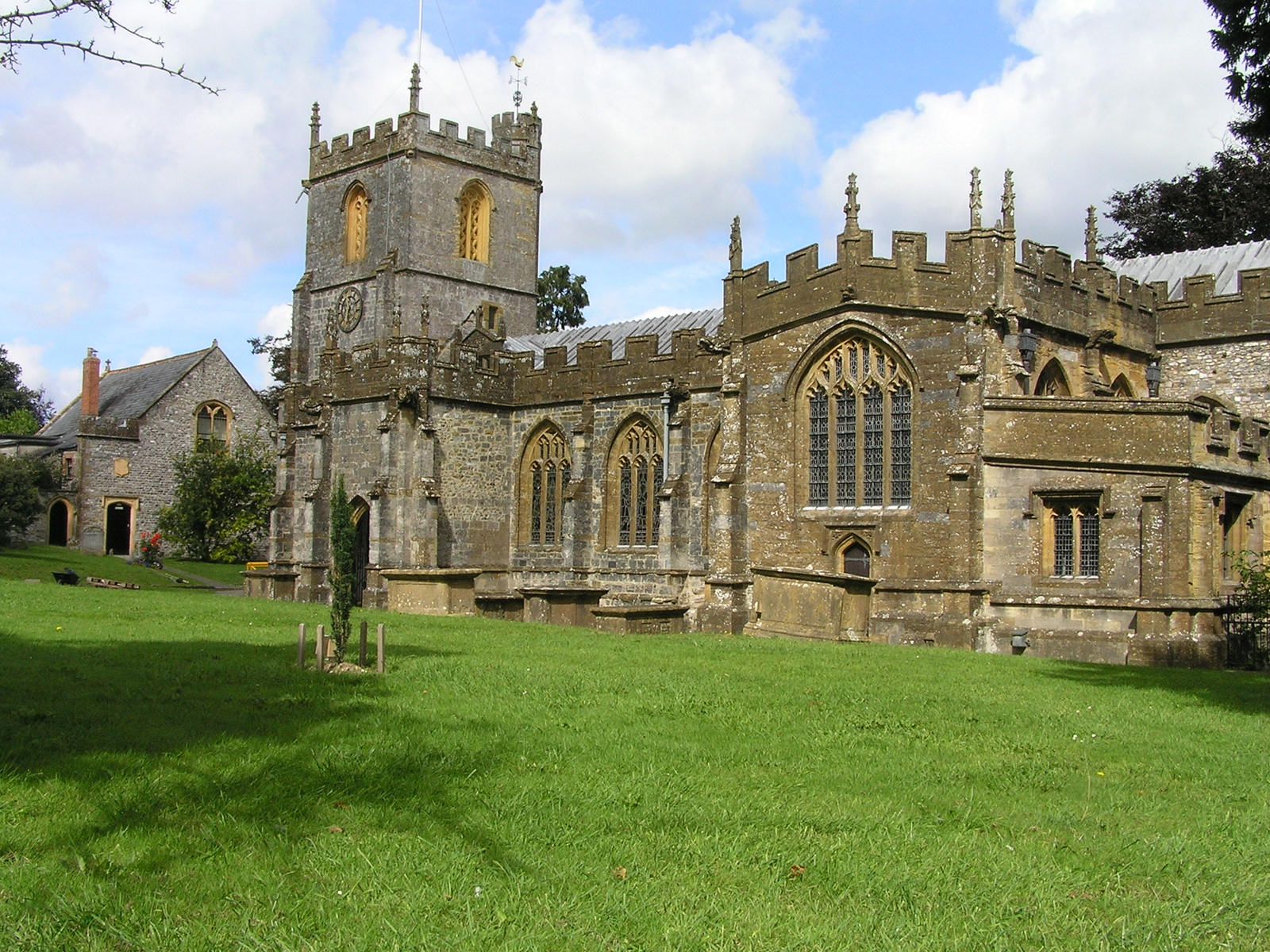
- Church of St. Mary the Virgin

- Location within Somerset
- Population: 14,292 (Parish, 2021)
- OS grid reference: ST325086
- Civil parish: Chard Town
- Unitary authority: Somerset Council
- Ceremonial county: Somerset
- Region: South West
- Country: England
- Sovereign state: United Kingdom
- Post town: CHARD
- Postcode district: TA20
- Dialling code: 01460
- Police: Avon and Somerset
- Fire: Devon and Somerset
- Ambulance: South Western
- UK Parliament: Yeovil

Chard is a town and a civil parish in Somerset, England. It lies on the A30 road near the Devon and Dorset borders, 15 miles (24 km) south-west of Yeovil. With an elevation of 121 metres (397 ft), Chard is one of the highest towns in Somerset. At the 2021 census, the parish had a population of 14,292.

The name of the town was Cerden in 1065 and Cerdre in the Domesday Book of 1086. After the Norman Conquest, Chard was held by the Bishop of Wells. The town's first charter was from King John in 1234. Most of the town was destroyed by fire in 1577, and it was further damaged during the English Civil War. A 1663 will by Richard Harvey of Exeter established Almshouses known as Harvey's Hospital. In 1685 during the Monmouth Rebellion, the pretender Duke of Monmouth was proclaimed King in the Town prior to his defeat on Sedgemoor. Chard subsequently witnessed the execution and traitor's death of 12 condemned rebels, who, tried by Judge Jeffreys, were hanged near the present Tesco roundabout. The Chard Canal was a tub boat canal built between 1835 and 1842. Chard Branch Line was created in 1860 to connect the two London and South Western Railway and Bristol and Exeter Railway main lines and ran through Chard until 1965.

The town has a very unusual feature, a stream running along either side of Fore Street. One stream eventually flows into the Bristol Channel and the other reaches the English Channel. Chard Reservoir, approximately a mile north east of the town, is a Local Nature Reserve, and Snowdon Hill Quarry a geological Site of Special Scientific Interest. Major employers in the town include Numatic International Limited. There are a range of sporting and cultural facilities, with secondary education being provided at Holyrood Academy; religious sites including the Church of St Mary the Virgin, which dates from the late 11th century.

== History ==
The earliest evidence of settlement near Chard is the Iron Age fort of Cotley Castle overlooking the Town near Bound's Lane. There was a small Saxon settlement centred round the Church and the area is still known as 'Old Town'. Chard's name was Cerden in 1065 and Cerdre in the Domesday Book of 1086 and it means "house on the chart or rough ground" (Old English: ćeart + renn). Before the Norman Conquest Chard was held by the Bishop of Wells. The town's first charter was from King John and another from the bishop in 1234, which delimited the town and laid out burgage holdings in 1-acre (4,000 m^{2}) lots at a rent of twelve pence per year. The parish of Chard was part of the Kingsbury Hundred,

Most of the town was destroyed by fire in 1577. After this time the town was largely rebuilt including Waterloo House and Manor Court House in Fore Street which were built as a house and courtroom, and have now been converted into shops and offices. In 2023, the historic Court House building was acquired by Somerset Council to safeguard its future. Further damage to the town took place during the English Civil War with both sides plundering its resources, particularly in 1644 when Charles I spent a week in the town.

A 1663 will by Richard Harvey of Exeter established Almshouses which became Harvey's Hospital. These were rebuilt in 1870 largely of stone from previous building. In 1685 during the Monmouth Rebellion, the pretender James Scott, 1st Duke of Monmouth, was proclaimed King in the Town and several locals joined his forces. Commander of the pursuing Royalist army, John Churchill, made a severe cautionary speech to the townsfolk in St Mary's. After the rebellion collapsed, Chard witnessed the execution and traitor's death of 12 of the Duke of Monmouth's rebels, who were summarily tried and condemned at Taunton Castle by Judge Jeffreys. They were hung, drawn and quartered by the 'Handcross tree' whose site was near the present Tesco roundabout. The tree was removed by the railway in 1864 amid loud local protests.

There was a fulling mill in the town by 1394 for the textile industry. After 1820 this expanded with the town becoming a centre for lace manufacture led by manufacturers who fled from the Luddite resistance they had faced in the English Midlands. Bowden's Old Lace Factory and the Gifford Fox factory are examples of the sites constructed. The Guildhall was built as a Corn Exchange and Guildhall in 1834 and is now the Town Hall.

On Snowdon Hill is a small cottage which was originally a toll house built by the Chard Turnpike trust in the 1830s, to collect fees from those using a road up the hill which avoided the steep gradient.

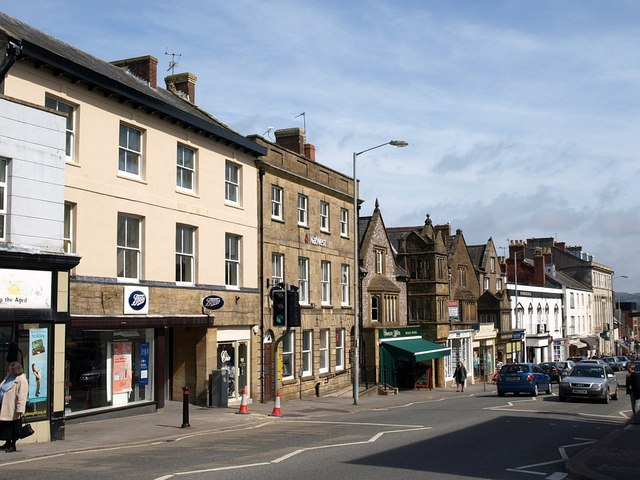
Fore Street

Chard is the birthplace of powered flight, as it was here in 1848 that the Victorian aeronautical pioneer John Stringfellow (1799–1883) first demonstrated that engine-powered flight was possible through his work on the Aerial Steam Carriage. James Gillingham (1839–1924) from Chard pioneered the development of articulated artificial limbs when he produced a prosthesis for a man who lost his arm in a cannon accident in 1863. Chard Museum has a display of Gillingham's work.

Chard was a key point on the Taunton Stop Line, a World War II defensive line consisting of pillboxes and anti-tank obstacles, which runs from Axminster north to the Somerset coast near Highbridge. In 1938 a bomb proof bunker was built behind the branch of the Westminster Bank. During the war it was used to hold duplicate copies of the bank records in case its headquarters in London was destroyed. It was also used to store the emergency bank note supply of the Bank of England. There has also been speculation that the Crown Jewels were also stored there, however this has never been confirmed.

Action Aid, the International Development Charity, had their headquarters in Chard when they started life in 1972 as Action in Distress. The Supporters Services department of the charity is still based in Chard.

== Governance ==
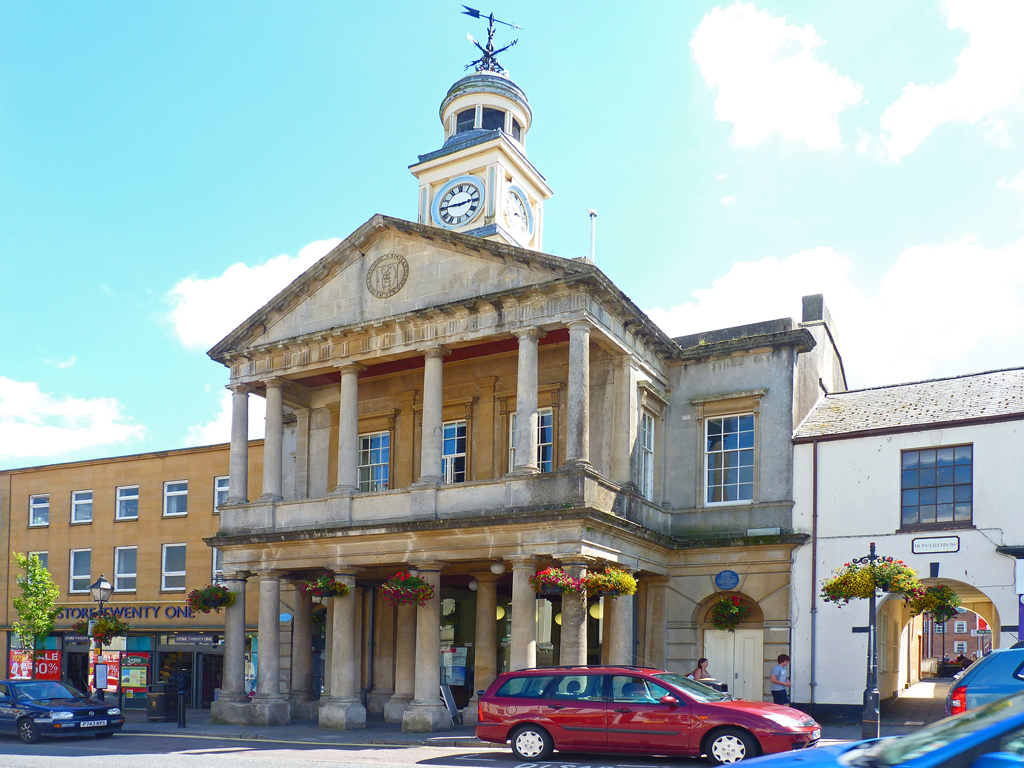
The Guildhall

There are two tiers of local government covering Chard, at parish and unitary authority level: Chard Town Council and Somerset Council. The town council is based at Chard Guildhall on Fore Street. The Guildhall was built in 1834.

For national elections, the town forms part of the Yeovil constituency.

=== Administrative history ===
Chard was an ancient parish in the Kingsbury hundred of Somerset. As well as the town itself, the parish historically also covered surrounding rural areas, especially to the south of the town. The town was also an ancient borough. A government survey of boroughs in 1835 found that the origins of the borough were obscure; the earliest surviving charter dated from 1683, but the borough was known to have been in existence much earlier than that. In 1835, the borough just covered 52 acres (21 hectares) around the town centre, primarily comprising High Street, Fore Street and Combe Street; the borough boundaries did not then include the area known as Old Town or the parish church of St Mary's.

From the 17th century onwards, parishes were gradually given various civil functions under the poor laws, in addition to their original ecclesiastical functions. In some cases, including Chard, the civil functions were exercised by subdivisions of the parish rather than the parish as a whole. In Chard, poor law functions were exercised separately for the area of the borough and the rest of the parish. In 1866, the legal definition of 'parish' was changed to be the areas used for administering the poor laws, and so the old parish was split into two civil parishes: 'Chard Borough' and 'Chard', the latter covering the rural parts of the old parish outside the borough.

The borough was reformed to become a municipal borough in 1836 under the Municipal Corporations Act 1835, which standardised how most boroughs operated across the country. The borough boundaries were enlarged in 1893, when the added territory included St Mary's Church and the Old Town area. The boundaries were enlarged again in 1933, gaining further areas from the surrounding rural parish of Chard.

The borough of Chard was abolished in 1974 under the Local Government Act 1972, with its area becoming part of the new district of Yeovil. The Yeovil district was renamed South Somerset in 1985. A successor parish was created covering the former Chard borough as part of the 1974 reforms, with its parish council taking the name Chard Town Council. To distinguish the parish covering the former borough of Chard and the surrounding rural parish of Chard, the successor parish was formally called "Chard Town". The surrounding rural Chard parish was renamed Tatworth and Forton in 1985.

South Somerset was abolished in 2023. Somerset County Council then took over district-level functions across its area, making it a unitary authority, and was renamed Somerset Council.

=== Twinning ===
Chard is twinned with Helmstedt in Germany (since 12 April 1980); Morangis, Essonne in France (since 29 May 1994); and Șeica Mare in Transylvania, Romania.

== Geography ==
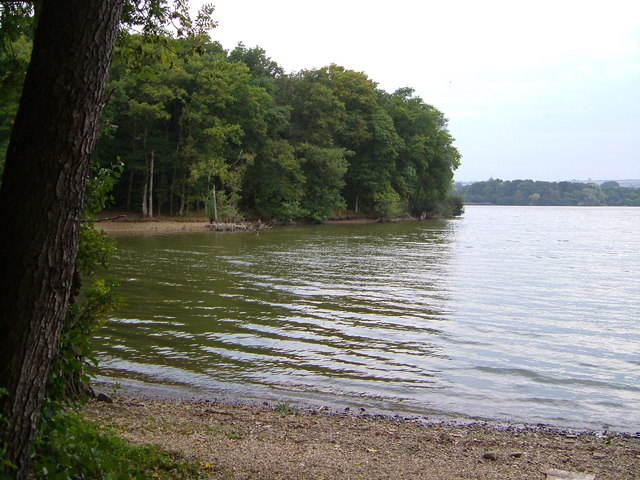
Chard reservoir

At an altitude of 121 metres (397 ft), Chard is one of the highest towns in Somerset, and is also the southernmost. The suburbs include: Crimchard, Furnham, Glynswood, Henson Park and Old Town. Local folklore claims that the town has a very unusual and unique feature, a stream running along either side of Fore Street. One stream eventually flows into the Bristol Channel and the other reaches the English Channel. This situation changed when the tributary of the Axe was diverted into the Isle; the gutter in Holyrood Street, though, still flows into the River Axe and therefore it is still true it lies on the watershed and that two gutters within the town eventually drain into the Bristol Channel and the English Channel.

The 36.97 hectares (91.4 acres) Chard Reservoir, around a mile northeast of the town, is a Local Nature Reserve. It is used for dog walking, fishing and birdwatching, with a bird hide having been installed. Species that are seen regularly include grey herons, kingfishers, great cormorants, little grebes, ducks and also a wide range of woodland songbirds. Others include the great white egret, cattle egret, and spotted redshank.

Snowdon Hill Quarry is a 0.6 hectare (1.3 acre) geological Site of Special Scientific Interest on the western outskirts. The site shows rock exposures through the Upper Greensand and Chalk, containing fossil crustaceans which are both unique and exceptionally well-preserved making it a key locality for the study of palaeontology in Britain. The unit has been dated to the subdivision of the Chalk known as the Turrilites acutus Zone, named after one of the characteristic fossils, which was laid down in the Middle Cenomanian era between 99.6 ± 0.9 MA and 93.5 ± 0.8 MA (million years ago).

There are also caves in Chard, first recorded in a charter of 1235 as being used by stonemasons, which provided local building stone. The cave is smaller than when it was used as a quarry as part of the roof has fallen in but a cave 20 feet (6.1 m) below ground still exists with the remains of the supporting pillars left when it was being worked.

=== Climate ===
Along with the rest of South West England, Chard has a temperate climate which is generally wetter and milder than the rest of the country. The annual mean temperature is approximately 10 °C (50.0 °F). Seasonal temperature variation is less extreme than most of the United Kingdom because of the adjacent sea temperatures. The summer months of July and August are the warmest with mean daily maxima of approximately 21 °C (69.8 °F). In winter mean minimum temperatures of 1 or 2 °C (33.8 or 35.6 °F) are common. In the summer the Azores high pressure affects the south-west of England, however convective cloud sometimes forms inland, reducing the number of hours of sunshine. Annual sunshine rates are slightly less than the regional average of 1,600 hours. In December 1998 there were 20 days without sun recorded at Yeovilton. Most of the rainfall in the south-west is caused by Atlantic depressions or by convection. Most of the rainfall in autumn and winter is caused by the Atlantic depressions, which is when they are most active. In summer, a large proportion of the rainfall is caused by sun heating the ground leading to convection and to showers and thunderstorms. Average rainfall is around 700 mm (28 in). About 8–15 days of snowfall is typical. November to March have the highest mean wind speeds, and June to August have the lightest winds. The predominant wind direction is from the south-west.

== Economy ==
Textile manufacture was important to the town during the Middle Ages. Chard is the birthplace of powered flight as in 1848 John Stringfellow first demonstrated that engine-powered flight was possible. Percy and Ernest Petter, who formed Westland Aircraft Works, witnessed some of Stringfellow's demonstrations in Chard and often asked for help in the formation of Westland's first aircraft development factory on the outskirts of Yeovil. AgustaWestland now holds the Henson and Stringfellow lecture yearly for the Royal Aeronautical Society. James Gillingham developed articulated artificial limbs. Chard is a key point on the Taunton Stop Line, a World War II defensive line.

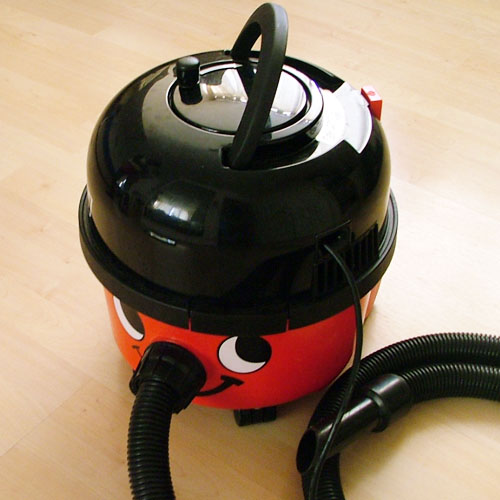
Numatic's Henry vacuum cleaner

Chard is the home of Numatic International Limited, notable for its 'Henry' vacuum cleaners with the characteristic large smiling face. The company employs over 700 people. In contrast to competitors such as Hoover and Dyson the firm continues to manufacture in Britain. The site occupies an area of more than 10 hectares and operates continuously, producing over 4,000 products per day.

Another large employer in Chard was Oscar Mayer, a producer of own-brand packaged ready-meals. (It is distinct from the American company of the same name owned by Kraft Foods). Oscar Mayer employed many Portuguese and, more recently, Polish workers. In 2007 it was announced that the factory would be bought by Icelandic company the Alfesca Group, which owns Lyons seafoods. However this deal fell through and the company announced 250 job losses. Oscar Mayer announced on 22 October 2020 that it was considering ending production at its Chard sites. Following collective consultation with its employees, the company decided to close the Chard sites, with most of the staff employed there becoming redundant. It was expected that the transfer of Oscar Mayer's Chard manufacturing business to its other UK sites would be complete by the end of September 2021.

Chard is also home to Brecknell Willis, one of the world's oldest and leading specialists in the design, construction and installation of railway electrification systems, most notably metro and light rail systems. Its largest customer, London Underground, purchases both train-borne equipment and infrastructure. In early July 2014 the company was bought by WABTEC, bringing it into the Wabtec Rail Group as well as the Falstand Electric Group. In 2023, the site's production facility was closed by Wabtec. The production was transferred to other Wabtec plants while the office in Chard will maintain its engineering, project management, and sales office.

== Transport ==
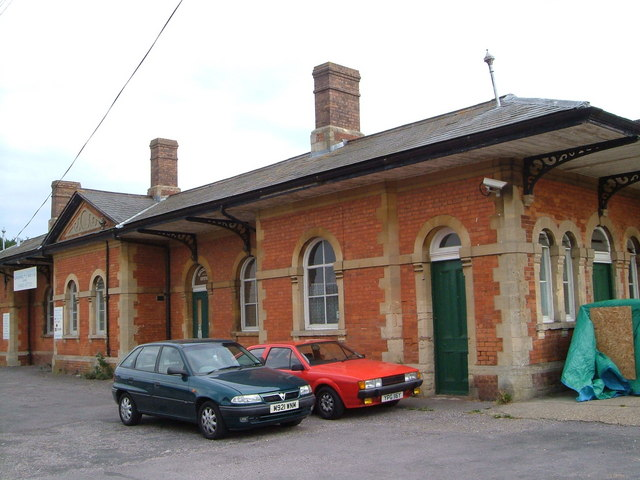
Central Station

From 1842 Chard was the terminus of the Chard Canal, a tub boat canal that joined the Bridgwater and Taunton Canal at Creech St. Michael. It had four aqueducts, three tunnels and four inclined planes along its 13.5-mile (21.7 km) length. It took seven years to construct and cost about £140,000 (£13.7 million in 2025).

The London and South Western Railway (LSWR) built its main line from London to Exeter to the south of Chard, opening in 1860. A station called Chard Road opened with the line, but lay some 2.5 miles (4.0 km) distant from the town. Shortly afterwards, a branch line was built from Chard Road to a new Chard Town station, which opened in 1863. Chard Road station was subsequently renamed Chard Junction. Another branch line serving the town was opened by the Bristol and Exeter Railway (B&ER) in 1866 and ran northwards, close to the route of the canal, to join their main line near Taunton. The two branch lines were connected at a station known at various times as 'Chard Joint', 'Chard' and 'Chard Central'. From 1917 the two branch lines were both operated by the Great Western Railway, but services were mostly advertised as though it was still two separate lines. The branch lines closed to passengers in 1962 and freight traffic was withdrawn a few years later, after which the branch lines were dismantled. Chard Junction station closed to passengers in 1966, but the line remains in use.

Part of the Taunton Stop Line has been incorporated into Route 33 of the National Cycle Network, which runs from Bristol to Seaton. The section between Chard and Ilminster follows a purpose-built traffic-free railway path that also formed part of the Stop Line.

The LSWR's station (later known as Chard Town) opened in 1860 with a single platform, and the B&ER's (variously known as Chard Joint or Chard Central) in 1866. For five years LSWR trains continued to call at Chard Town and then reversed to the connecting line and then resumed their forward journey to the Joint station. In 1871 a new platform was opened on the connecting line; this closed to passengers on 1 January 1917 but the town station was the main goods depot for the town until it finally closed on 18 April 1966. Passenger trains ceased to operate to Chard Central on 11 September 1962, and private goods traffic on 3 October 1966. The station building and train shed still stand and are in use by engineering companies.

The town's public transport links to Taunton are now provided by First Group's Buses of Somerset. Two routes go between the towns. Route 30 and route 99, which both run hourly during weekdays. There is also a service to Yeovil via Crewkerne provided by South West Coaches

== Sport ==
Chard has a number of local sport clubs. Chard Town F.C. play football in the Somerset County League, whilst a number of Chard football clubs play in the Perry Street and District League. The Rugby union club, Chard RFC, was formed in 1876. The Club runs 3 Senior sides, with the 1stXV playing currently in South West One (west) achieving promotion to National League 3 South West on 26 April 2014 beating Old Towcestrians in the playoff final. Chard Hockey Club was established in 1907 and it now runs three male and three female sides. There are also facilities for cricket, tennis, bowls, darts and golf. The Wessex Pool League is also played in a number of Pubs in Chard, along with the Chard and District Darts League.

== Local media ==
Television signals are received from either the Mendip or Stockland Hill TV transmitters.

Radio stations for the area are BBC Radio Somerset on 95.5 FM, Heart West on 97.1 FM, Greatest Hits Radio South West on 106.6 FM and Radio Ninesprings on 104.6 FM.

Local newspapers are the Chard and Ilminster News, Somerset County Gazette, Somerset Guardian and Standard and Somerset Live.

== Education ==
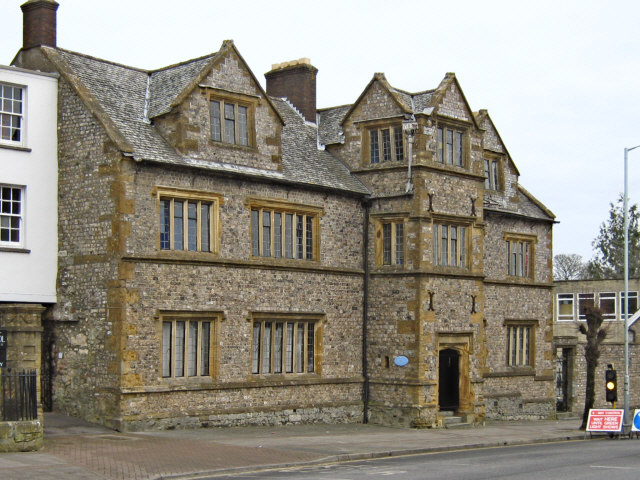
Chard School

The original school building in Fore Street was built in 1583 a private residence for William Symes of Poundisford. In 1671 his youngest son, John, conveyed the property to 12 trustees so that it should be converted into a grammar school – according to his father's wish. Today, it is known as Chard School, a private school for children ages 4 to 11.

Avishayes Community Primary School, Manor Court Community Primary School, Tatworth Primary School and The Redstart Primary School all offer primary education, while Holyrood Academy offers secondary education. The school, as of 2019, has 1,276 pupils between the ages of 11 and 18.

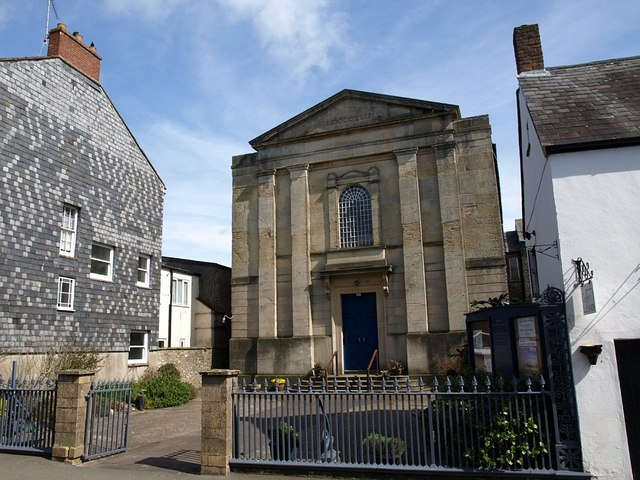
Baptist church

== Religious sites ==
The Anglican Church of St Mary the Virgin dates from the late 11th century and was rebuilt in the 15th century. The tower contains eight bells, of which two were made in the 1790s by Thomas Bilbie of the Bilbie family in Cullompton. The three-stage tower has moulded string courses and an angle stair turret in the north-west corner. The church has been designated by English Heritage as a grade I listed building. There is a church room, built in 1827. The Baptist Church in Holyrood Street was built in 1842.

== Notable residents ==
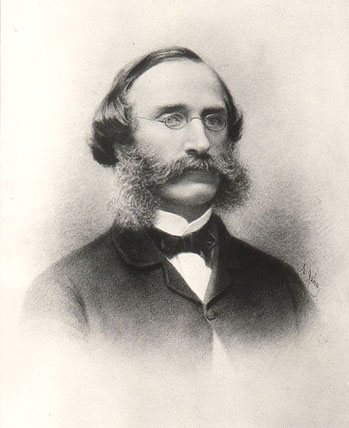
William Samuel Henson

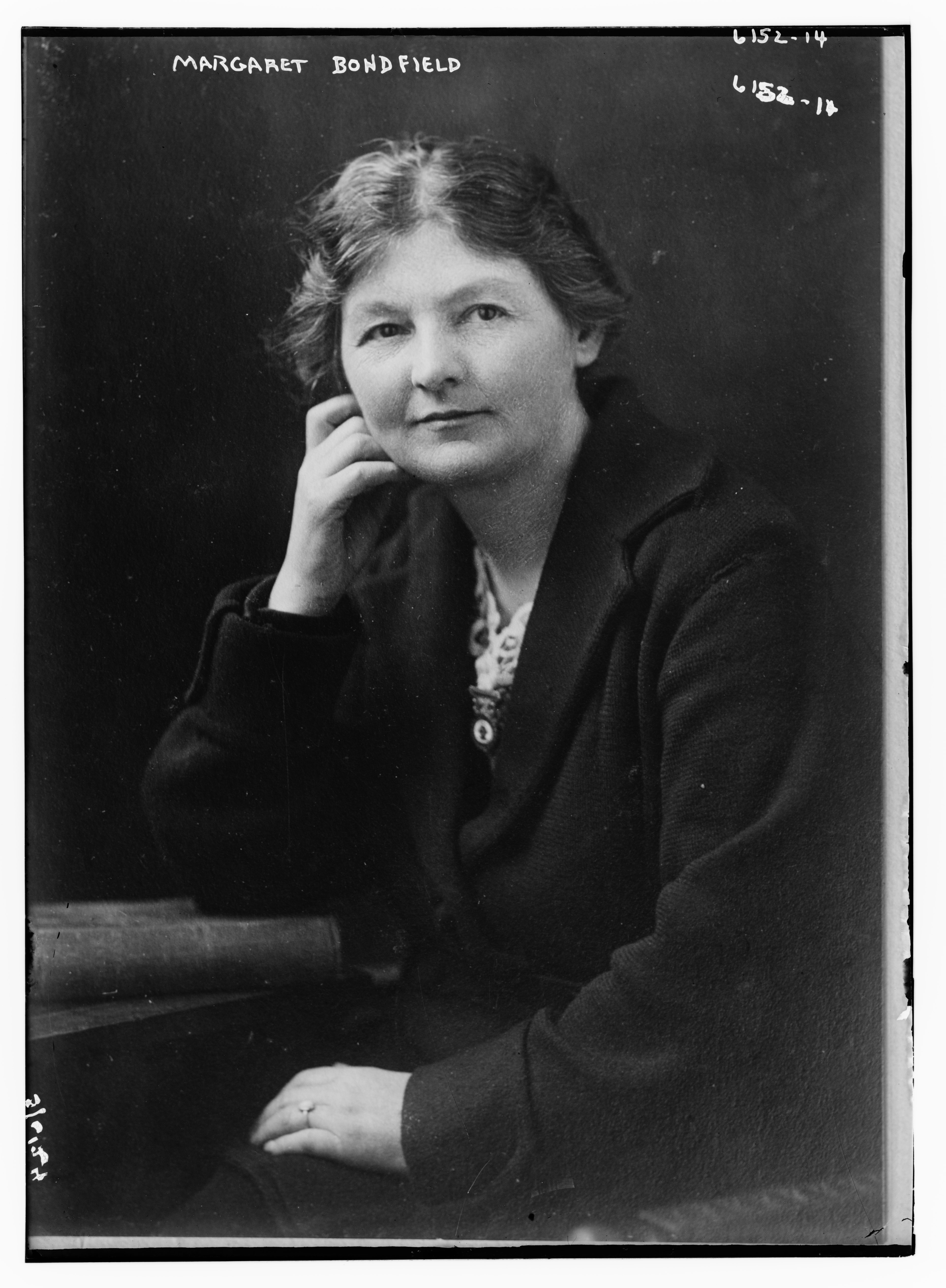
Margaret Bondfield, 1900

- Thomas Cogan (1545?–1607), an English physician.
- John Sandford (c.1565–1629), clergyman and academic, a grammarian of the Romance languages.
- John Strong (1610–1699), New England colonist, politician, and one of the founders of Windsor, Connecticut and Northampton, Massachusetts.
- John Bond (1612–1676), jurist, Puritan clergyman, member of the Westminster Assembly, and Master of Trinity Hall, Cambridge.
- Robert Adkins (1626–1685), one of the most notable of the two thousand ejected ministers of 1662.
- Samuel Thomas (1627–1693), a nonjuring clergyman and controversialist.
- Henry Thompson (1797–1878), an English cleric and author.
- William Samuel Henson (1812–1888), aviation engineer and inventor, who worked with fellow Chard resident John Stringfellow (1799–1883) to achieve the first powered flight, in 1848, in a disused lace factory, with a 10-foot (3.0 m) steam-driven flying machine.
- James Gillingham (1839–1924), pioneered the development of articulated artificial limbs
- Corporal Samuel Vickery (1873–1952), of the Dorset Regiment, awarded the Victoria Cross in 1897 for his actions during the attack on the Dargai Heights, Tirah, India during the Tirah Campaign.
- Margaret Bondfield (1873–1953), a politician and feminist; the first UK woman Cabinet minister.
- Frederick Dwelly (1881–1957), the first Dean of Liverpool.
- Sir Cullum Welch (1895–1980), Army officer, businessman and Lord Mayor of London, 1956/1957.
- Lucy Cox (born 1988), an abstract artist, who has exhibited work nationally and internationally and curated exhibitions in London.

=== Sport ===
- Pat Beasley (1913–1986), footballer and manager who played in 406 games and one for England
- Ben Hamer (born 1987), football goalkeeper, has played over 340 games

== See also ==
- South West England
- West Country dialects
