= Spanish Galleon, Greenwich =

Pub in Greenwich, London

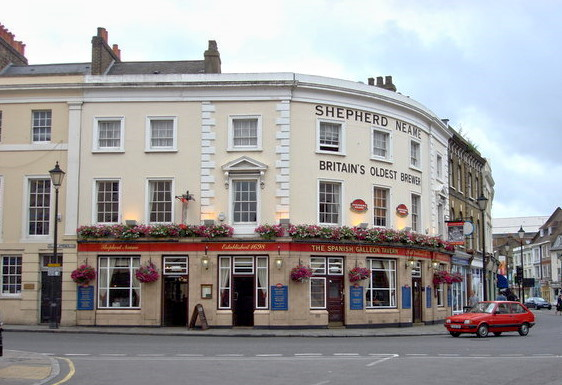
- The Spanish Galleon

- Location within Royal Borough of Greenwich Location within Greater London

General information
- Location: 1 College Approach, Greenwich, London, England
- Coordinates: 51.4817°N 0.0099°W

Design and construction
- Designations

Listed Building – Grade II
- Official name: Spanish Galleon Public House
- Designated: 8 June 1973
- Reference no.: 1079029

Website
- www.spanishgalleon.co.uk

The Spanish Galleon is a public house at 1 College Approach, Greenwich, London, that was built in 1836 as part of Joseph Kay's redevelopment of central Greenwich in the Regency style. It has been grade II listed since 1973 and is managed by the brewers Shepherd Neame.

== History ==
The Spanish Galleon was built in 1836, on the south side of College Approach (formerly Clarence Street) where it meets Greenwich Church Street, as part of Joseph Kay's redevelopment of central Greenwich around 1830 which replaced its congested and narrow streets with a more spacious street layout and architecture in the Regency style. Donald Stuart writes that local history sources indicate that there had been a Galleon inn on the site for 200 years before the current building was constructed.

Its name has been attributed to the pictures of British naval victories over the Spanish in the nearby Greenwich Hospital. A number of existing or former public houses in the area have nautical names, such as the Admiral Hardy, Gipsy Moth, Trafalgar Tavern, and the Yacht Tavern.

The building has been grade II listed since 1973 along with other buildings on the south side of College Approach and 37 and 37A King William Walk. English Heritage note the "unified composition" of the pub and the associated market buildings and the stucco finish and entablature which obscures the view of the roof, as well as the variety of architectural features relating to the windows and their surrounds.

A well-preserved sailor's uniform was found in the cellar when the pub was renovated in 1985, and was subsequently displayed in the bar. Uniform has since changed locations or has been removed.

== Management ==
The pub is managed by the brewers Shepherd Neame and has been awarded the Cask Marque for the quality of its real ale.

== See also ==
- List of pubs in London
