= Greenwich Church Street =

Street in Greenwich, London

Coordinates: 51.48134°N 0.00996°W

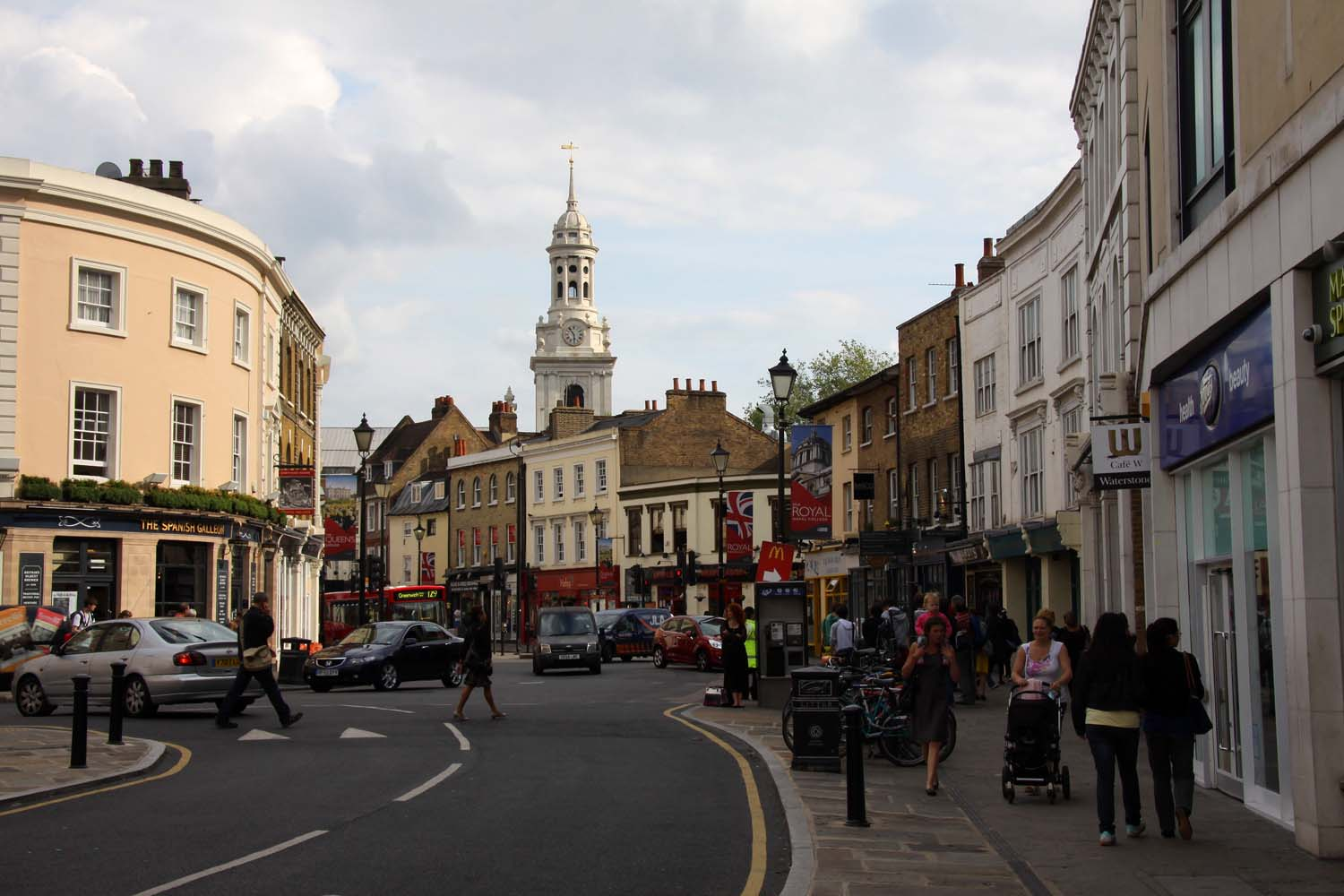
Looking south towards St Alfege Church. The Spanish Galleon pub is on the left.

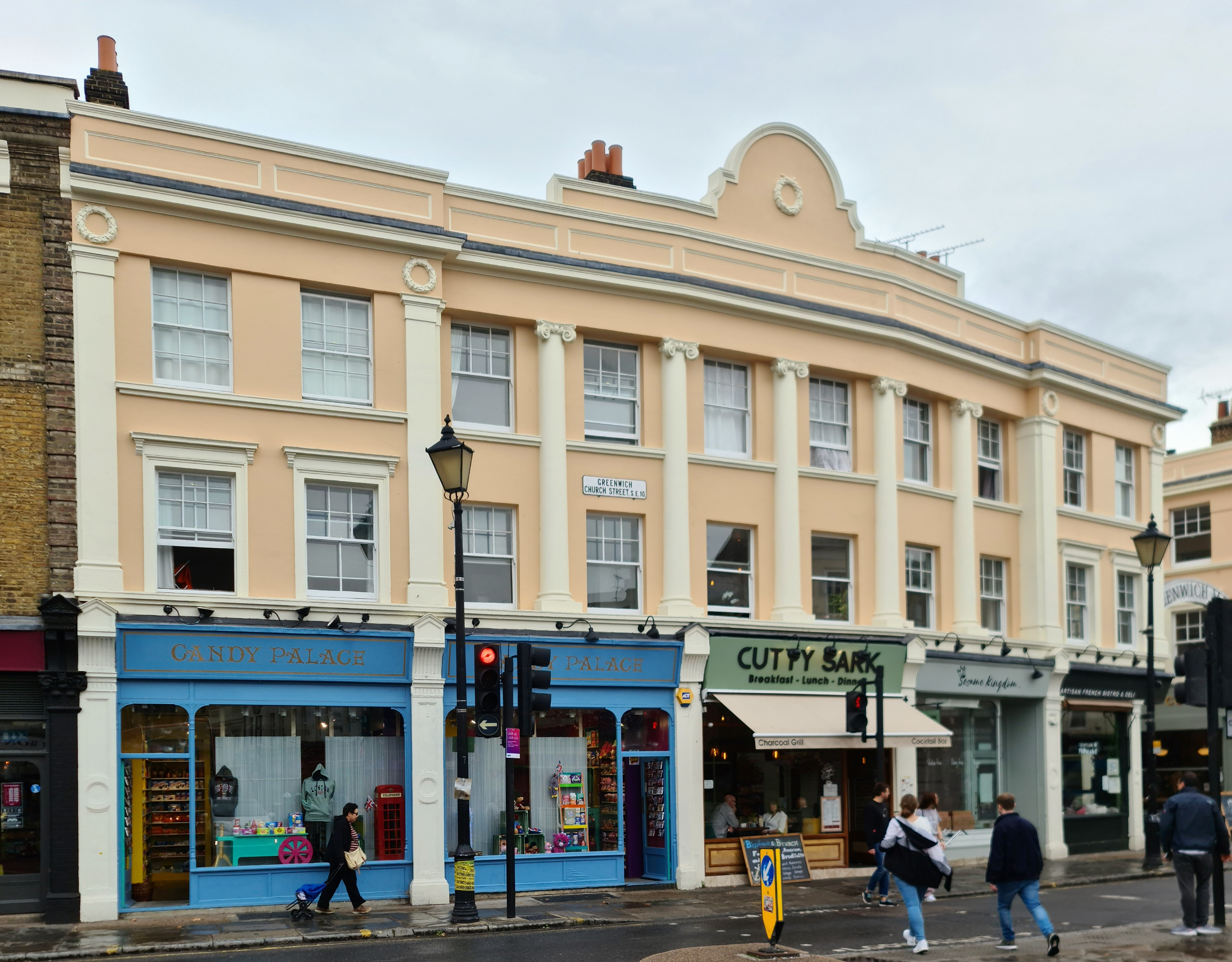
Properties in the middle of Church Street

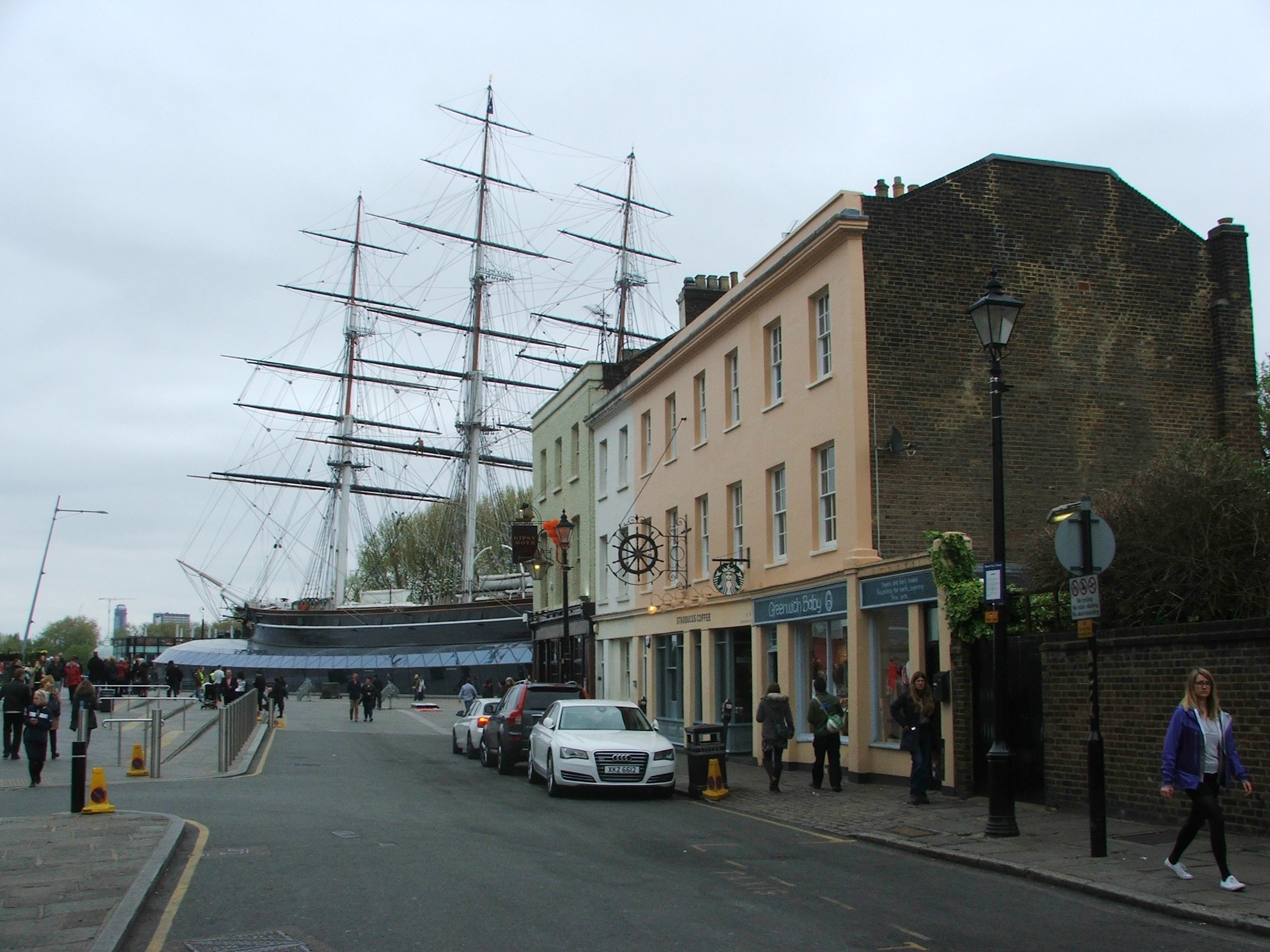
Northern end of the street towards Cutty Sark.

Greenwich Church Street is a street in central Greenwich in South East London. It diverges from Greenwich High Road at St Alfege Church and curves north through the commercial centre of the town until it reaches the Cutty Sark by the River Thames. College Approach branches off it east towards King William Walk and the Old Royal Naval College. It is located in the middle of what was medieval Greenwich. Its current configuration dates back to the redevelopment of Greenwich in the 1820s by the architect Joseph Kay, but is based on a much older road marked as Greenwich High Street or Church Street on a late seventeenth century map. It runs through the heart of central Greenwich, close to the Cutty Sark DLR station, and has many shops and restaurants. An entrance to Greenwich Market is located on the east side of the street.

== Bibliography ==
- Cherry, Bridget & Pevsner, Nikolaus. London 2: South. Yale University Press, 2002.
- Sweetinburgh, Sheila. Later Medieval Kent, 1220-1540. Boydell & Brewer, 2010.
