= Curlew Rowing Club =

British rowing club

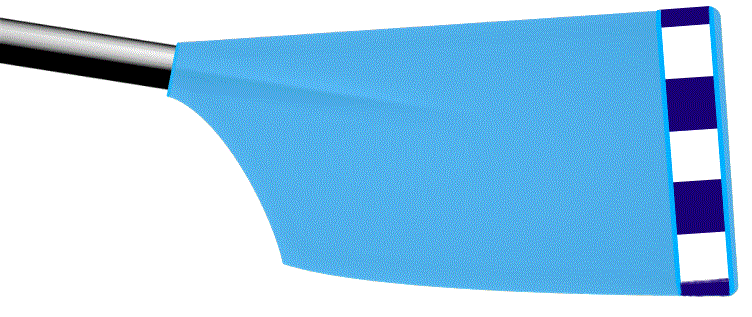
- Location: Greenwich, United Kingdom
- Coordinates: 51°28′11.3″N 0°13′14.7″W
- Home water: Tideway, London Docklands
- Founded: 1866
- Affiliations: British Rowing
- Website: curlewrowingclub.co.uk

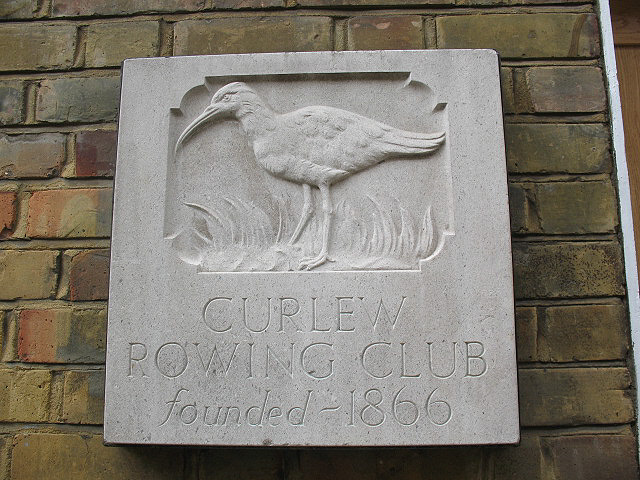
Emblem on the boathouse

Curlew Rowing Club is a rowing club based on the Tideway of the River Thames at Greenwich, London, England. It was founded in 1866 and has been in Greenwich without interruption for over 130 years, though not always called Curlew.

== History ==
The first regatta at which a “Curley” crew is believed to have rowed was held at Greenwich in 1787. In the first half of the 19th century “Curley” was one of several crews, along with a crew called “The Argonauts”, who had their own boats in the Greenwich and Deptford reaches. The Argonauts grew substantially in numbers until some of its members transferred their activities to Putney, to form the London Rowing Club with the object of rowing at Henley.

The “Curley” crew remained in Greenwich and in 1866 a club was formed in order to rent the (now demolished) Crown Sceptre Pub in Greenwich. “Curley”, by this stage had become “Curlew” and had incorporated the residue of the “Argonauts” and another crew “Lurline” who had been unable to carry on independently. Curlew then occupied the "Crown and Sceptre" until the building was demolished in 1934. So after 68 years Curlew moved to the "Trafalgar Tavern" where Curlew had a Club room / bar and a small basement gym. These premises where leased at that time from the Greenwich Hospital Estates.

=== Modern day ===
Curlew Rowing Club is now based in out of the Trafalgar Rowing Centre only a few doors down from their old home. Curlew moved to the Trafalgar Rowing Centre in late 2003, and with the Trafalgar Trust (Curlew Rowing Club and Globe Rowing Club) now own a new boathouse and gym in Greenwich. Furthermore, on the water training takes place at the London Regatta Centre based at the Victoria and Albert Docks, where Curlew has access to a complete multi-laned buoyed 2 km racing lake. Recently some boats have been relocated to Greenwich to train on the River Thames again.

Curlew has had much success on the water qualifying and competing at Henley Royal Regatta most years since 2000. 2011 saw the club qualify two VIIIs to The Thames Challenge Cup, the first time in the club's history and the first time a club east of Putney has done so. In 2016 Curlew Rowing Club won the Ampthill Cup for elite pairs at The Metropolitan Regatta, this is the first time and only time Curlew Rowing Club have won this event.

Further to the success of the Men's squad, the Women reached the quarter final of Women's Henley, and the Women's Senior Double achieving Bronze at the National Championship of Great Britain.

== Results ==
Year	HoRR	WHoRR	Metropolitan Regatta	Reading Amateur Regatta	Marlow Regatta	Women's Henley	Henley Royal Regatta	City of Oxford	National Championships
04–05	Curlew A race abandoned	Curlew A 61					Curlew A (Wednesday)		
05–06	Curlew A 123	Curlew A 56		Curlew A Winner Senior VIII			Curlew A (Thursday)		
06–07	Curlew A 85	Curlew A 86					Curlew A (Wednesday)		
07–08	Curlew A race abandoned	No Curlew Entry					Curlew A (Wednesday)		
08–09	Curlew A 181	Curlew A 140					Curlew A Qualifiers	Mixed Medley Winners	
09–10	Curlew A 196	Curlew A 237	Curlew A IM1 Final	N/A		W2x Senior QF	Curlew A (Wednesday)	Mixed Medley Winners	
10–11	Curlew A 167	Curlew A 168	Winner Senior W2x	Curlew B Winner IM3 VIII		WVIII Club QF	Curlew A & Curlew B (Wednesday)		W2x Bronze
11-12	Curlew A 76	Curlew A 88	Curlew A IM1 Final	Curlew A IM1 Final	Curlew A Senior Final	WIV+ 11/24 Time Trial	Curlew A (Thursday)		
12-13	Curlew A race abandoned	Curlew A 114	Curlew A IV+ Senior Final	Curlew A IV+ Elite Final	Curlew A IV+ Elite Final	DNF	Curlew A (Thursday)		
13-14	Curlew A race abandoned	Curlew A 125	Curlew A WIM2 Final			DNQ	DNQ		
14-15	Curlew A 213	Curlew A 76					DNQ		
15-16	Curlew A 137	Curlew A 124	Ampthill Cup Winners (Elite Pair)				DNQ		
16-17	Curlew A race abandoned	Curlew A 77	W 8+ Tier 1 Final Op 4- Tier 3 Final Op 8+ Tier 1 Final			DNQ	Curlew 8+ (Wednesday) Curlew 4- (Thursday)	Mx 8+ / W.IM3.8+ / Mx.Nov.2x / IM2.2- / IM1.2- / W.IM3.4+ / Nov.1x /	
17-18	Curlew A 63	Curlew A 61 (Medium Club Pennant Winner)	Op 8+ Chall Final W.8+ Chall Final	Sen 8+ Final		Aspirational Club 8+ Quarter-Final	Curlew 8+ (Wednesday)	Mx 8+ / W 4+ / Mx2x / Op 2-	

=== Henley Royal Regatta ===
Curlew Rowing Club have qualified for Henley Royal Regatta 18 out of 22 seasons since 2000, making Thursday on a number of occasions during this period. In 2011 and 2012 Curlew have managed to qualify both a 1st and 2nd VIII into the Thames Challenge Cup, a feat only matched by Thames Rowing Club in West London.

- 2000 - Wyfold Challenge Cup - RD1 Curlew bt Furnival SC by 3 lengths. RD2, Lea RC bt Curlew by 1 length
- 2000 - Thames Challenge Cup - RD1 Molesey Boat Club 'B' bt Curlew by 4 lengths
- 2001 - Wyfolds Challenge Cup - RD1 Aberdeen Boat Club bt Curlew easily
- 2002 - Wyfolds Challenge Cup - RD1 Aberdeen Boat Club bt Curlew easily
- 2002 - Thames Challenge Cup - RD1 Curlew bt London Rowing Club 'C' by 1 1/2 lengths, RD2 London RC 'A' bt Curlew by 4 lengths
- 2003 - Thames Challenge Cup - RD1 Curlew bt City of Oxford RC by 2 1/4 lengths, RD2 Lady Victoria Boat Club bt Curlew by 3 lengths
- 2004 - Thames Challenge Cup - RD1 Mitsubishi BC* bt Curlew by 5 lengths (*Mitsubishi were subsequently disqualified as being ineligible to race)
- 2005 - Thames Challenge Cup - RD1 Curlew bt Mortlake Anglia & Alpha BC by 1 3/4 lengths. RD2, Molesey bt Curlew by 1 3/4 lengths
- 2006 - Thames Challenge Cup - RD1 Hamburger und Germania RC bt Curlew by 3 1/4 lengths
- 2007 - Thames Challenge Cup - RD1 Nottingham RC bt Curlew by 2 lengths
- 2008 - Thames Challenge Cup - RD1 Tees RC bt Curlew by 3/4 length
- 2009 - DNQ
- 2010 - Thames Challenge Cup - RD1 Reading RC bt Curlew by 1 3/4 lengths
- 2011 - Thames Challenge Cup - RD1 Lea RC bt Curlew 'A' by 1 1/2 lengths, RD1 Greenlake BC (USA) bt Curlew 'B' by 2 1/2 lengths
- 2012 - Thames Challenge Cup - RD1 Curlew 'A' bt Curlew 'B' by 4 3/4 lengths, RD2 Thames 'A' bt Curlew 'A' by 2 1/2 lengths
- 2013 - Britannia Challenge Cup - RD1 Thames 'A' bt Curlew 'A' by 1 1/2 Lengths
- 2014 - DNQ (Britannia Challenge Cup)
- 2015 - DNQ (Thames Challenge Cup)
- 2016 - DNQ (Thames Challenge Cup & Silver Goblets & Nickells Challenge Cup)
- 2017 - Wyfolds Challenge Cup - RD1 Curlew bt Bedford Rowing club by 1 1/3 lengths, RD2 Commercial Rowing club bt Curlew by 4 1/4 lengths.
- 2017 - Thames Challenge Cup - Leeds Rowing Club bt Curlew by 4 feet.
- 2018 - Thames Challenge Cup - Itchen Imperial Rowing Club bt Curlew by 1 1/2 lengths.
- 2019 - Wyfolds Challenge Cup - Team Keane bt Curlew RC by 3 1/4 lengths.
- 2020 - No regatta
- 2021 - Wyfolds Challenge Cup - Elizabethan RC bt Curlew RC by 5 lengths.
- 2022 - Wyfolds Challenge Cup - Northwich RC bt Curlew RC by 4 1/2 lengths.

=== Woman's Henley Regatta ===
- 2004 - The PriceWaterhouseCoopers Cup - RD2 - Vesta RC bt Curlew by 1 1/4 lengths
- 2005 - The Lester Trophy - RD2 - Agecroft BC bt Curlew by 4 lengths
- 2009 - The Rosie - RD1 - Mortlake Anglian & Alpha BC bt Curlew by 1 1/4 Lengths
- 2010 - The Rosie - Semi-Finals - Sport Imperial BC bt Curlew by 2 lengths
- 2011 - The Rosie - RD1 - ASR Nereus NED bt Curlew by 4 lengths
- 2011 - The PriceWaterhouseCoopers Cup - Quarter-Finals - Glasgow RC bt Curlew by 2 lengths
- 2012 - The Lester Trophy - DNQ (Time Trial 11/24 crews)
- 2013 - Did not enter
- 2014 - DNQ
- 2015 - Did not enter
- 2016 - DNQ (Fastest non-qualifier)
- 2017 - DNQ
- 2018 - Aspirational Club 8+ - RD1 Curlew bt Bristol (C) by 4 1/2 lengths, Quarter-Final - Thames (A) bt Curlew by 3 lengths
- 2019 - The Lester Trophy - RD1 Curlew bt Staines by 3 lengths, Quarter-Final - Tideway Scullers School (A) bt Curlew by 1 1/2 lengths
- 2020 - No regatta
- 2021 - The Lester Trophy - Marlow bt Curlew by 2 lengths
- 2022 - The Copas Cup - Putney Town bt Curlew by 1/2L lengths

== See also ==
- Rowing on the River Thames
- Henley Women's Regatta
