= Ward Muir =

British author and photographer (1878–1927)

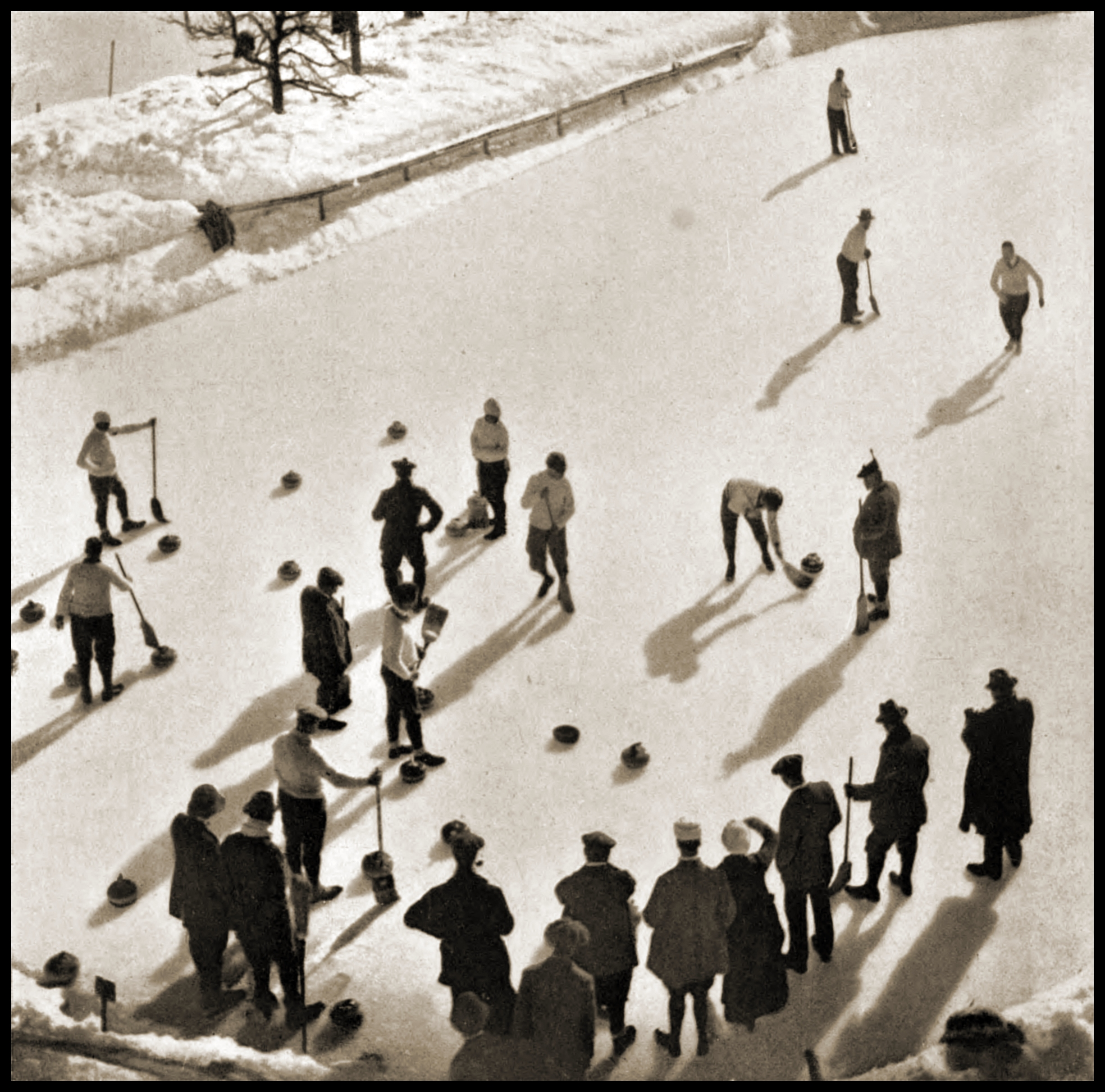
"Curling at Kandersteg", by Ward Muir

Wardrop Openshaw Muir (22 June 1878 – 9 June 1927) was a British photographer, journalist, editor, and author, known as Ward Muir.

== Early life ==
Muir was born in Waterloo, Lancashire, the younger son of the Rev. J. J. Muir, a minister of the Waterloo Presbyterian Church of England, and his wife Sarah Openshaw Clapperton, both born in Scotland. His older brother and sister had also been born there, and his father had previously served as a minister in St Helier, Jersey. The young Muir was educated at Merchant Taylors' School, Crosby, and Brighton College.

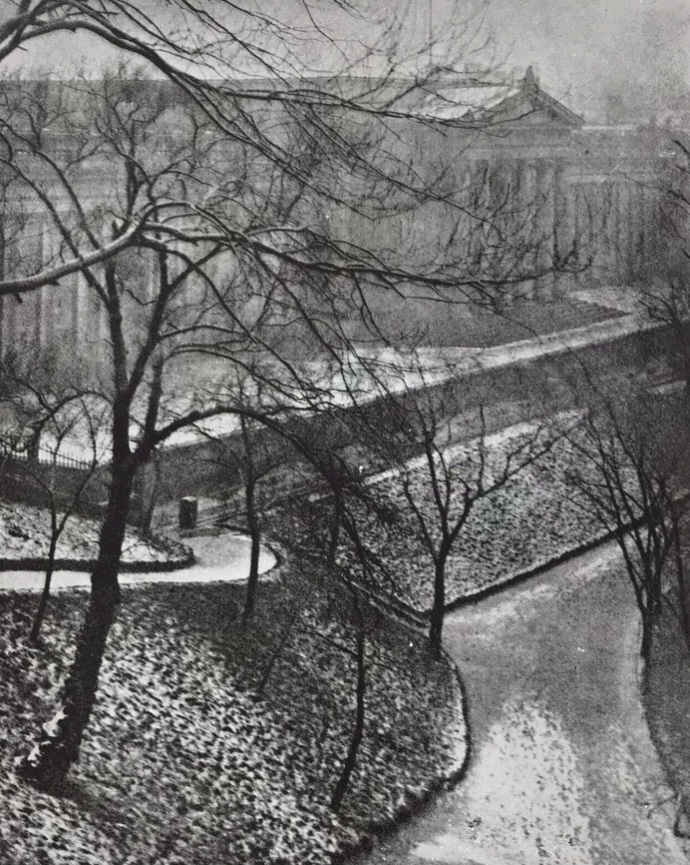
Ward Muir, "Edinburgh in Winter the Thaw"

Muir was given his first camera by a Scottish clergyman, and by 1894, while still at school, was a committee member of the Waterloo Social Camera Club. In 1895, he gave a lecture to the club on "Reminiscences of Scotland", illustrated by magic lantern slides.

After leaving school, Muir matriculated at Liverpool University, but soon after that his health broke down, due to a lung disease, and he was ordered to go to Davos. While there, he started writing stories for boys and met an editor of Northcliffe newspapers. This led to a job at Carmelite House in Fleet Street, working on women's magazines. His publisher later commented "Heaven only knows how many pseudonyms he must have adopted here, but I believe his nerve deserted him when it came to the fashion hints."

After travelling in France, the Low Countries, Italy, and Austria, about 1898 Muir began selling photographic work to magazines. In March of that year, he joined the Cyclists' Touring Club from an address in Waterloo.

Muir became active in the Practical Correspondence College, which taught how to make photography pay.

In 1902, Muir's father died, while on a visit to Scotland, leaving an estate valued at more than £6,000, equivalent to £668,119 in 2025. His mother died in Edinburgh in November 1914.

== Career ==
At the age of twenty-three, Muir settled in London as a freelance journalist. His photographs and writing appeared in the magazine Camera Work in its first year, 1903, and were still appearing there in the summer of 1914. He took long breaks from work to travel, covering all of Europe, apart from the Balkans and Scandinavia, also visiting Egypt and North America. It was later reported that he had been "compelled to travel throughout a good many years of his life as a means of fighting the lung disease which eventually killed him."

Muir's novel When We Are Rich (1911) is a tale of Bohemian art student life, with "a fascinating flirt, a delightful old maid, and a generous baron". His next novel, Cupid's Caterers (1914) mocks the business of women's magazines, through a fictional one called Honeysuckle. It also has hard words for the profession of journalism. A review of the book in The Spectator notes the line "in its way, a Spectator article is no more difficult than a Honeysuckle one.

During the First World War, Muir made several unsuccessful attempts to enlist in the army, but in 1915 was accepted as a private into the Royal Army Medical Corps, joining up with a group of artists and writers from the Chelsea Arts Club. He served as an orderly with his artist friends Francis Derwent Wood and C. R. W. Nevinson, working at the Third London General Hospital at Wandsworth, where he established a magazine, "Happy Though Wounded". In Observations of an Orderly (1917), Muir wrote of wounded soldiers arriving from the theatres of war and "the spontaneous geniality of the battered occupants". This book was followed by The Happy Hospital (1918). Muir was promoted to Lance Corporal and ended the war serving on the Italian front.

In 1919, Muir wrote a series of memoirs for The Amateur Photographer, under the title "Photographic Days". Also in 1919, the publisher Ivor Nicholson wrote a complimentary two-page article about Muir which appeared in The Bookman. He noted that "Ward Muir is a really expert photographer and is one of the very few men who have succeeded in writing interestingly about photography."

In October 1920, Muir was reported to have suffered a breakdown in health, due to over-work, soon after completing a book of short stories, Adventures in Marriage. This led to a long stay in Switzerland to recover.

After his return, Muir worked as a writer and photographer for The Amateur Photographer. His weekly column "Critical Causerie" appeared under the pen name of "The Bandit", but he was still in poor health.

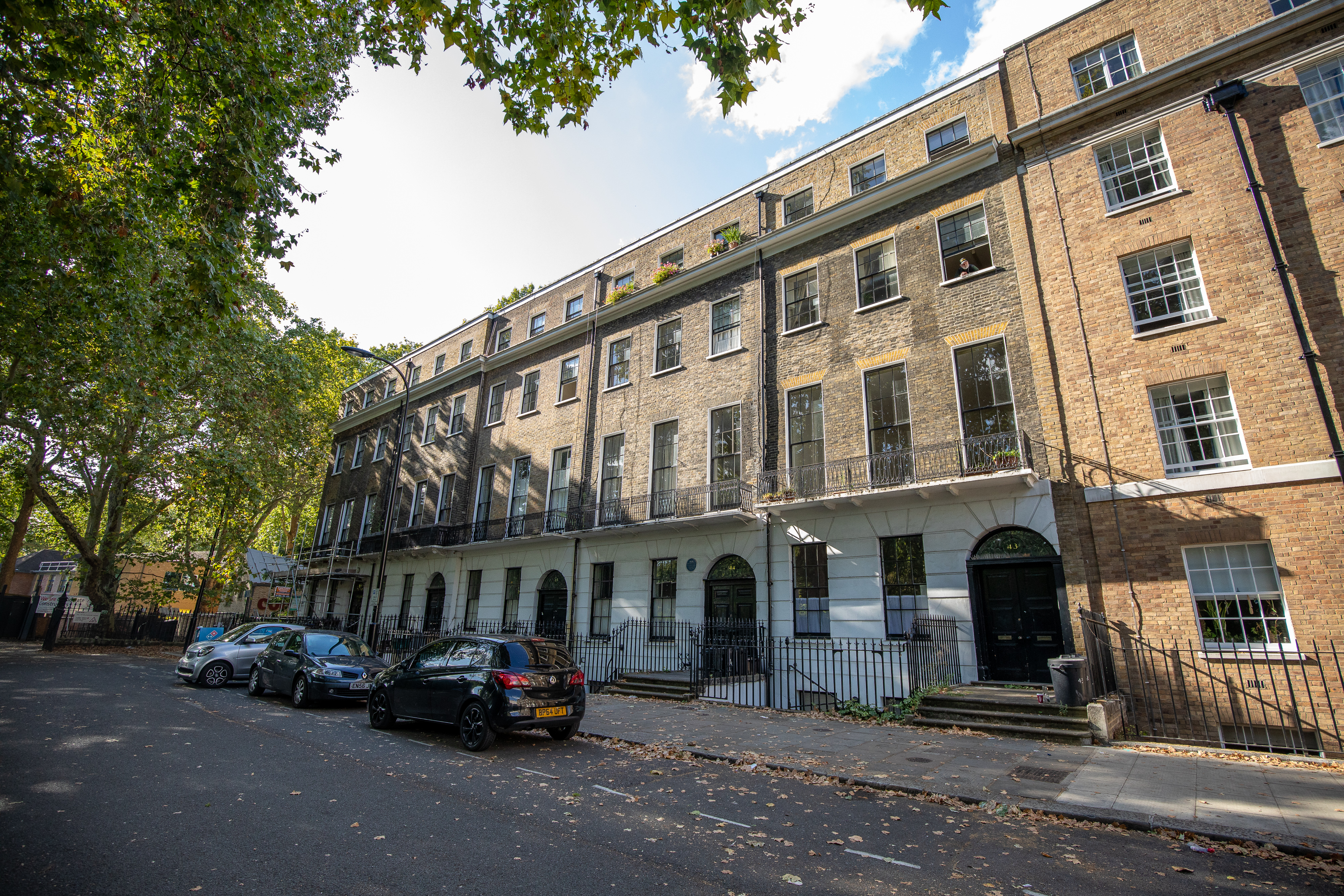
43-47 Mecklenburgh Square

In 1924, Muir's story "The Reward of Enterprise" was included in Catharine Dawson Scott's collection Twenty-Three Stories by Twenty and Three Authors.

Muir's novel No Fuss was published two months after his death. The central character, Miriam, has many lovers in artistic circles in Chelsea, mostly rich men. In its review, The Spectator comments that the minor characters are very life-like, but "It is difficult to believe in the beautiful Miriam herself and impossible to suppose that she lived happily and virtuously ever after in the company of Bob Taylor, a very unexciting person."

Muir died at home, at 44 Mecklenburgh Square, St Pancras, on 9 June 1927. He was reported to have been in poor health for a long time, with a final decline lasting some weeks. He left a widow, Dorothea Muir, and an estate valued at £2,614, equivalent to £141,981 in 2025.

== Novels ==
- The Amazing Mutes: their week in lovely Lucerne (1910)
- When We Are Rich: a callow chronicle of frivolous affairs (London: Stanley Paul & Co., 1911)
- Cupid's Caterers (London: Stanley Paul and Co., 1914)
- Further East than Asia: a romantic adventure (London: Simpkin, Marshall, Hamilton, Kent, 1919)
- Jones in Paris (London: John Lane, the Bodley Head, 1926)
- No Fuss (London: Richards, 1927)
- The Bewildered Lover (London: John Lane, 1928)

== Short stories ==
- "A Khaki Complication" (Black and White Budget, 16 Feb 1901)
- "Sargasso" (1908)
- "The Man With the Ebony Crutches" (February 1908)
- "Detective Tempest Faces the Music" (1912)
- "The Reward of Enterprise" (1913)
- "The Chic Lady of Snowland" (1921)
- Adventures in Marriage (London: Simpkin, Marshall, 1920)

== Non-fiction ==
- Observations of an Orderly: Some Glimpses of Life and Work in an English War Hospital (London: Simpkin, Marshall, Hamilton, Kent, & Co., 1917)
- The Happy Hospital (London: Simpkin, Marshall, Hamilton, 1918)
- "Visiting-Day at a War Hospital: some varied memories of contrasting callers", The War Illustrated, 27 April 1918, pp. 203–204
- A Camera for Company (London: Selwyn & Blount, 1923)
