= Mecklenburgh Square =

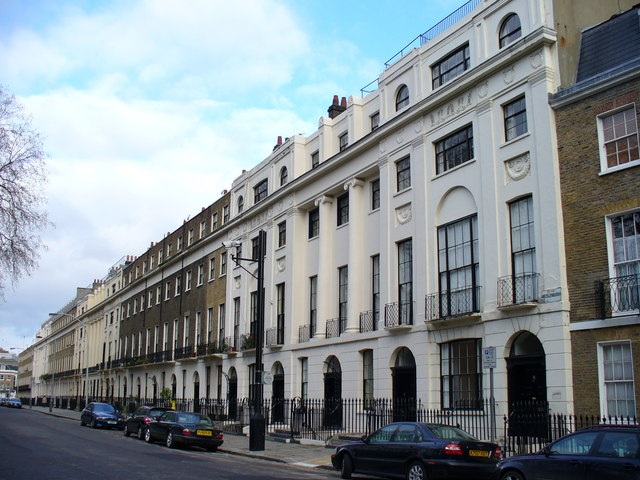

- Location within Greater London
- 51.52499°N 0.1173°W
- Type: Square
- Location: Bloomsbury, London, UK

History
- Built: 1804-1825

Site notes
- Architect(s): Joseph Kay, Eastern side
- Architectural style: Georgian
- Governing body: Privately owned

National Register of Historic Parks and Gardens
- Official name: Coram’s Fields with Mecklenburgh and Brunswick Squares
- Designated: 1 October 1987
- Reference no.: 1000212

Mecklenburgh Square is a Grade II listed square in the King's Cross area of the former parish and borough of St Pancras, in the London Borough of Camden. The square and its garden were part of the Foundling Estate, a residential development of 1792–1825 on fields surrounding and owned by the Foundling Hospital. The square was named in honour of Queen Charlotte of Mecklenburg-Strelitz. Its construction was begun in 1804, but was not completed until 1825.

It is notable for the number of historic terraced houses that directly overlook the square and Mecklenburgh Square Garden. The garden itself is accessible only to residents holding a key, except during special occasions such as the Open Garden Squares Weekend, when it is open to all visitors.

In the face of proposals for its partial redevelopment, in 1938 the Georgian Group campaigned to preserve the square, staging a successful fundraising ball and fair in the gardens. The group aimed to ensure "that as many people as possible may see Mecklenburgh Square as it is now: one of the last perfect examples of Georgian architecture in London". The square is perhaps best known as the home of some of the most celebrated writers of the early 20th century, including Virginia Woolf, who lived at no. 37. The square was damaged by enemy bombs in 1940.

The garden was laid out between 1809 and 1810 as the centrepiece of the newly developed Mecklenburgh Square; buildings on the eastern side were designed by architect Joseph Kay. The 2-acre (0.81 ha) garden is made up of formal lawns, gravel paths, mature plane trees and other ornamental trees. It contains a children's playground and a tennis court. The east side of the garden is planted with plants native to New Zealand.

To the west is Coram's Fields, and to the east is Gray's Inn Road, a major local thoroughfare. Goodenough College is a postgraduate residence and educational trust on the north and south sides of the square, and operates an academic-oriented hotel on the east side. Russell Square tube station is located to the south-west of the square, and the railway termini King's Cross and St Pancras are a short walk north.

Mecklenburgh Square, Brunswick Square and Coram's Fields are jointly listed Grade II on the Register of Historic Parks and Gardens.

== Notable residents ==
- Samuel Parkes (chemist) died here on 23 December 1825.
- Thomas Carlyle and Jane Welsh Carlyle took lodgings at 4 Amport Street, Mecklenburg Square from late Oct 1831 to 25 March 1832. It was here he wrote his acclaimed review of Boswell's Life of Johnson and the brief "Baron Von Goethe" article published in Fraser's magazine (March 1832).
- Karl Pearson lived at no. 40 as a child from 1866 to 1875.
- At no. 21 there is a blue plaque for R. H. Tawney (1880 – 1962), historian. In the same doorway is a blue plaque for Sir Syed Ahmed Khan (1817–1898), who lived there from 1869 to 1870.
- William Baylebridge lived for a time on Heathcote Street around the year 1909.
- Ward Muir, photographer and author, lived at No. 44
- H.D. (Hilda Doolittle; 1886-1961), American poet, also lived briefly at No. 44, from 1917 to 1918, as recorded by a plaque, although not an English Heritage one.
- Helena Normanton, the first practising female barrister, with a number of other legal firsts to her name, is honoured by a blue plaque at no. 22, where she lived during her early legal career.
- Jane Ellen Harrison, the classicist and linguist, lived with Hope Mirrlees at no. 11 Mecklenburgh Street from 1926 to her death in 1928.
- Virginia Woolf lived at no. 37 from 1939 to 1940. The house was bombed in a German air raid in 1940 and replaced in 1957 by William Goodenough House at Goodenough College.
- Emanuel Litvinoff, poet and writer, lived here until his death aged 96.
- Eileen Power, the medievalist scholar and expert on the lives of medieval women, lived on the square from 1922 to 1940.
- Dorothy L. Sayers, detective writer, lived at number 44 in 1920-21, where she began her first Lord Peter Wimsey novel, Whose Body? Her character Harriet Vane lives in the square in Gaudy Night.
- Lucia Moholy, photographer and editor who documented the architecture and products of the Bauhaus, and introduced their ideas to a post-World War II audience, lived at 39 Mecklenburgh Square from 1934.

== Gallery ==
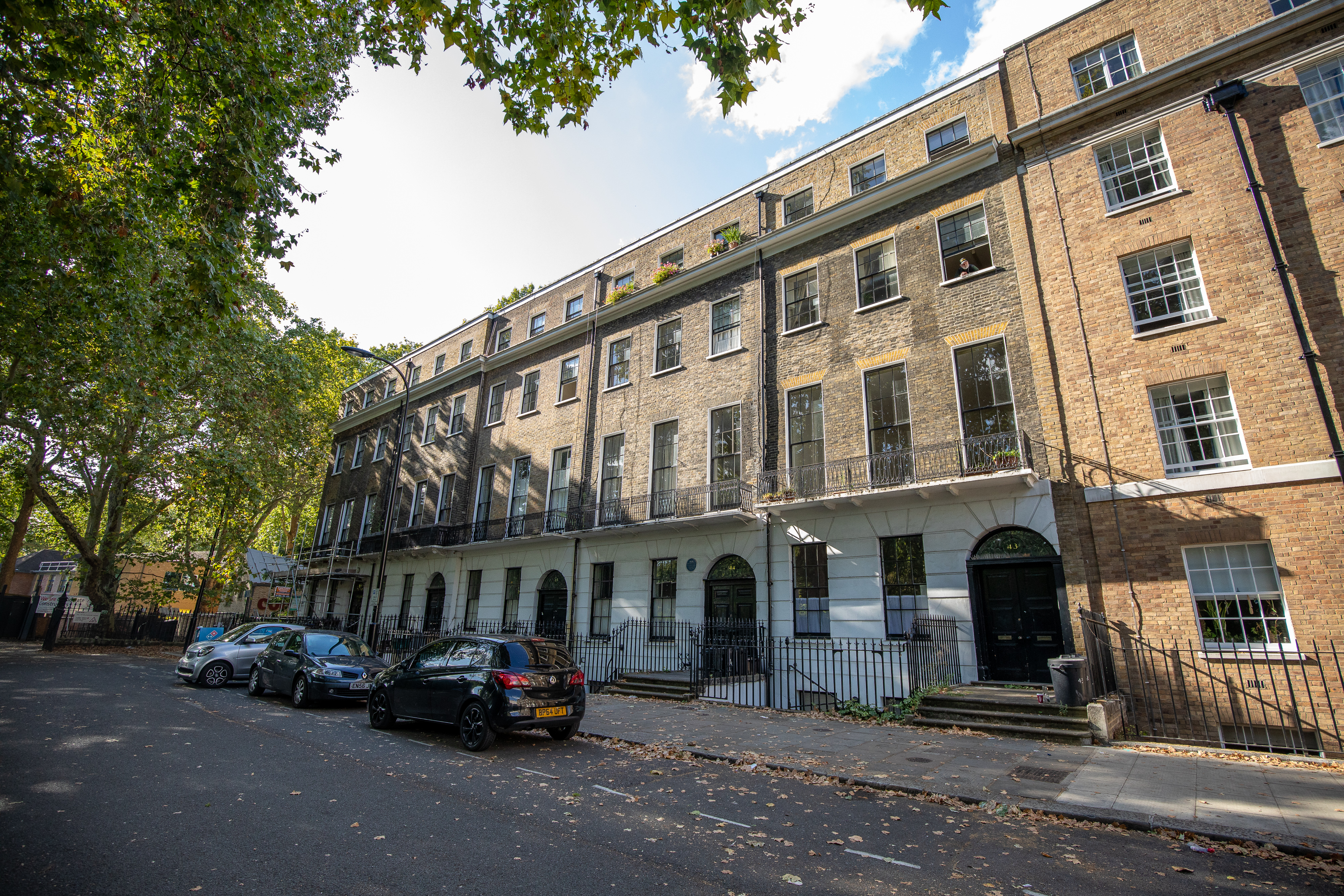
Numbers 43–47 and attached railings

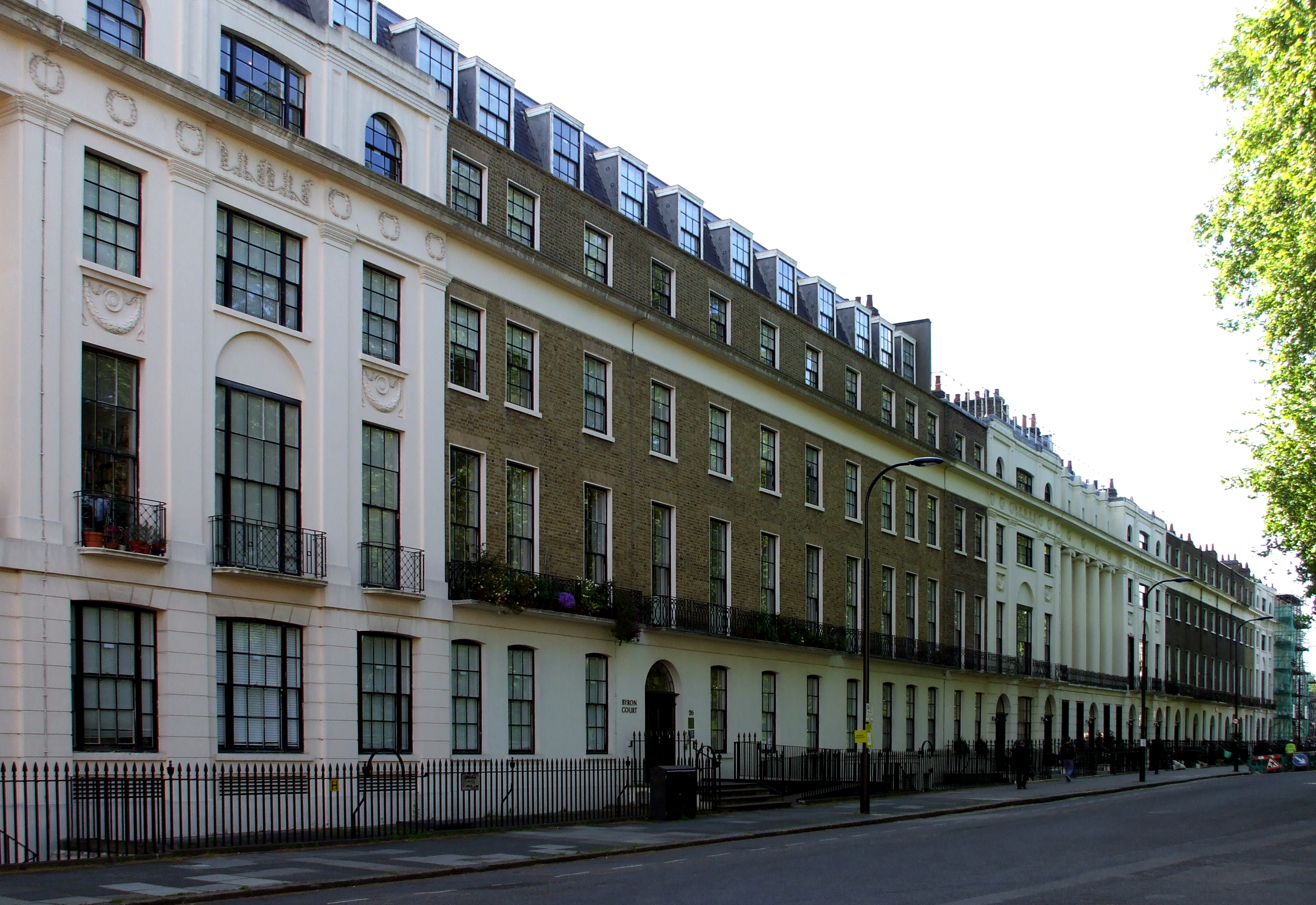
Mecklenburgh Square from NW

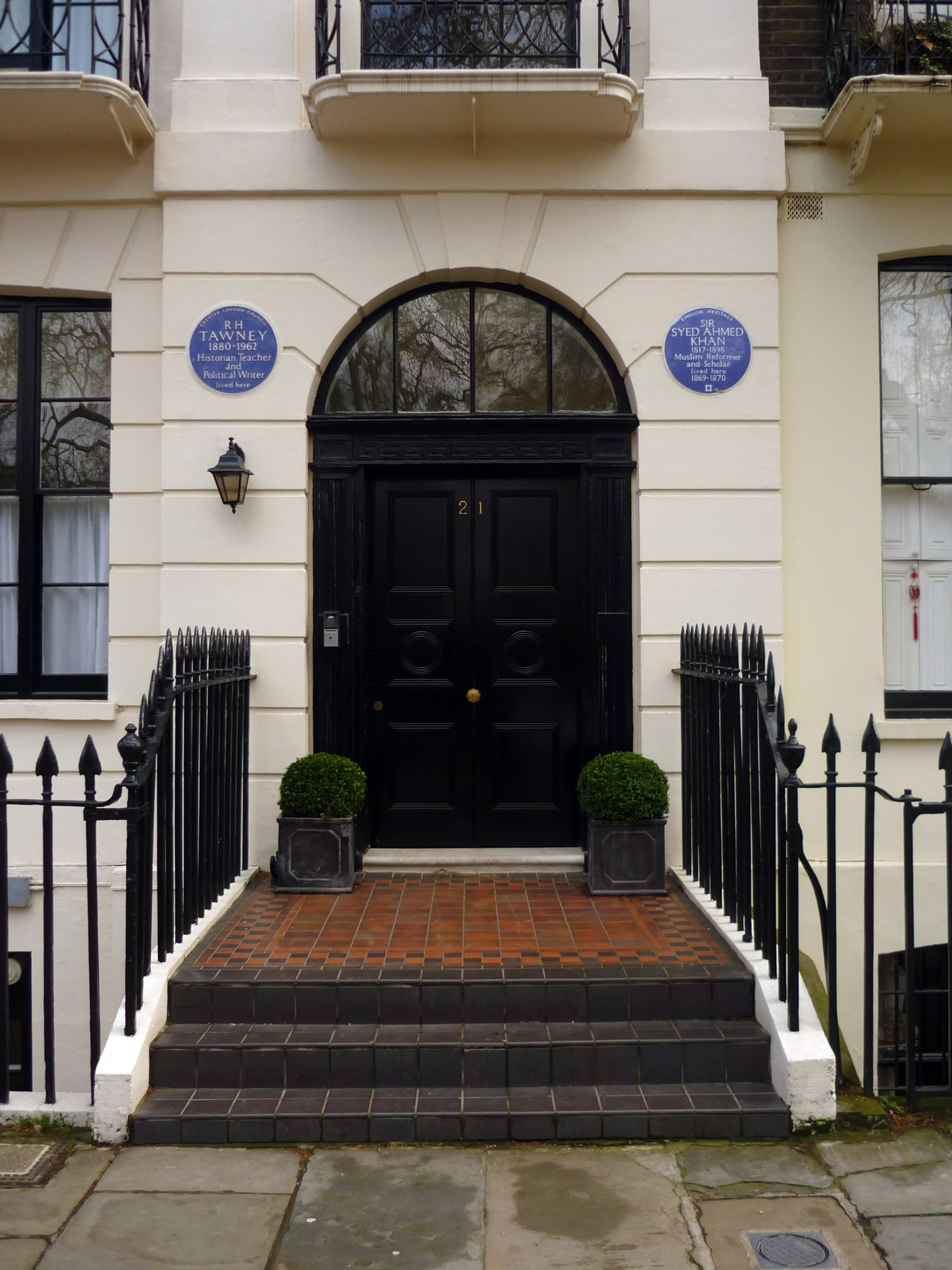
Twin blue plaques

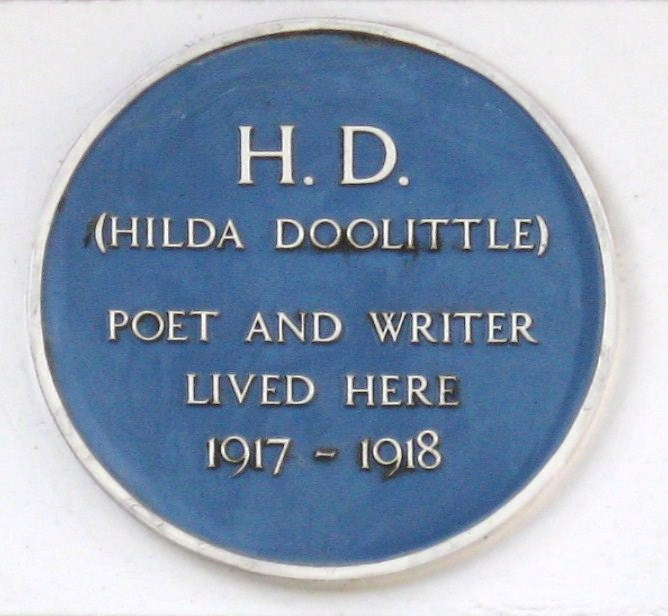
Plaque on number 44
