= Trafalgar Tavern =

Pub in Greenwich, London

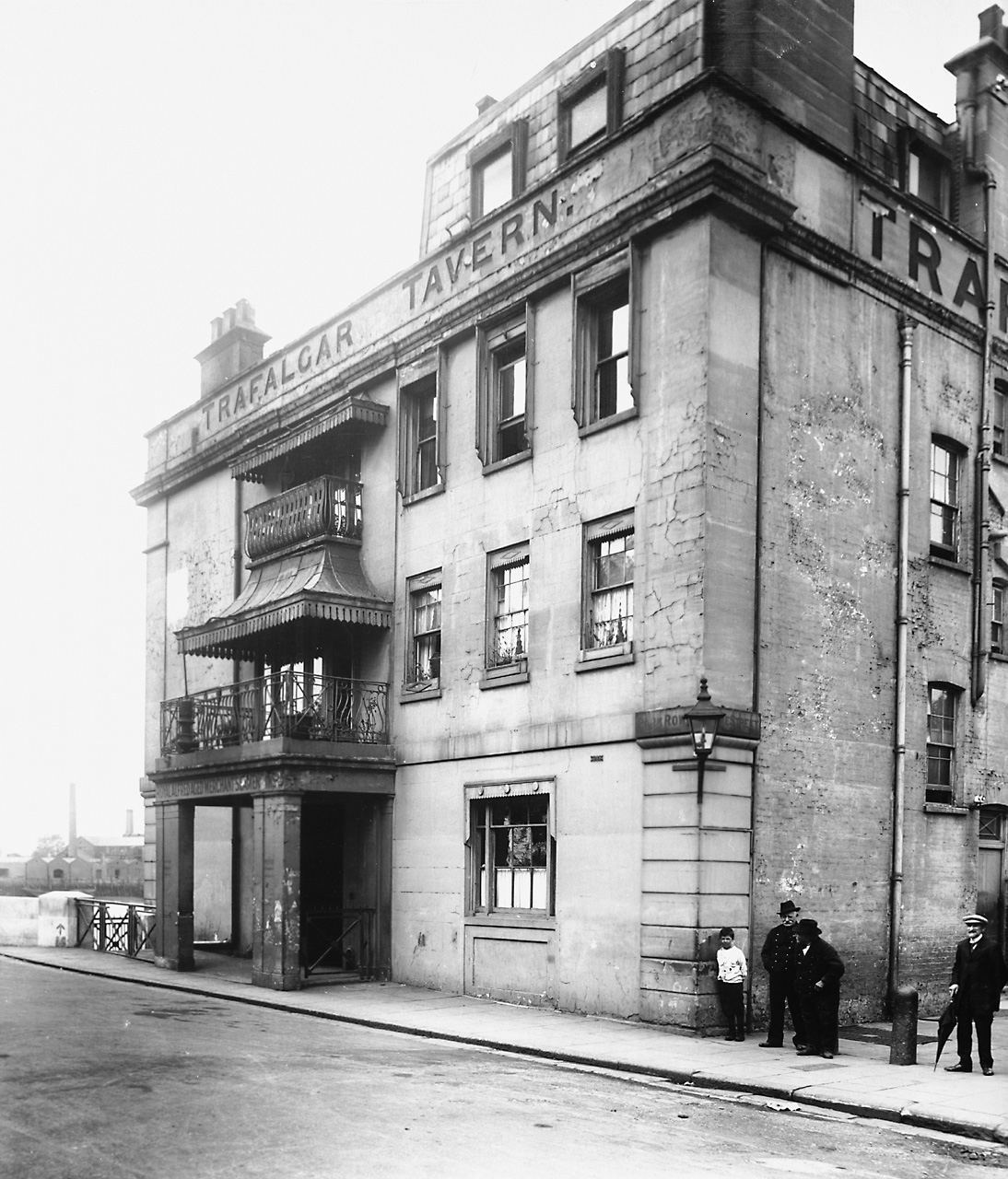
- Trafalgar Tavern (1912)

- Location within Royal Borough of Greenwich Location within Greater London

General information
- Location: Park Row, Greenwich, London SE10, England
- Coordinates: 51°29′04″N 0°00′15″W
- Opened: 1837

Design and construction
- Architect: Joseph Kay
- Designations

Listed Building – Grade II
- Official name: Trafalgar Tavern
- Designated: 7 June 1973
- Reference no.: 1078950

The Trafalgar Tavern is a Grade II listed public house at the north end of Park Row, Greenwich, London, on the south bank of the River Thames, east of and adjacent to the Old Royal Naval College. Built by the architect Joseph Kay on the site of a previous tavern and opened in 1837, it operated until 1915, after which the building was used for other purposes, including as a working men's club and residential accommodation. The Tavern reopened in 1965, was refurbished in 1968 and gained listed building status in 1973. It is located within the eastern boundary of the Maritime Greenwich World Heritage Site, designated by UNESCO in 1997.

== History ==
The Trafalgar Tavern was built on the site of 'The Old George Tavern'. This catered for local fishermen, but the owner wanted to enlarge the premises to serve the growing numbers of visitors to Greenwich. In 1830 he applied for planning permission to extend The Old George, employing the architect Joseph Kay, who sabotaged the owner's application and took over the lucrative site himself. He designed a Regency-styled building which opened in 1837.

The Trafalgar Tavern was visited by writers including Wilkie Collins, William Makepeace Thackeray and Charles Dickens, who drank here with the illustrator of many of his novels, George Cruikshank. In 1865, Dickens set the wedding breakfast in Our Mutual Friend in the Trafalgar Tavern's Hawke Room. It also became well known as the venue for political whitebait dinners for the Liberal Party in Victorian times, the last being held in 1885 when the outgoing Cabinet of William Gladstone dined together.

=== 20th century ===
In 1915 the Tavern closed and served as a home for aged seamen, the Royal Alfred Aged Merchant Seamen's Institution, (Note: The institution was established in 1857 to create a society to care for "worn-out and disabled merchant seamen". It established a home at Belvedere House in Erith in 1865. Three years later, Prince Alfred becomes the hospital's first Patron and the society became the Royal Alfred Aged Merchant Seamen’s Institution, a name it retained for 82 years. Today it is the Royal Alfred Seafarers' Society.) during the First World War, later becoming a working men's club (1920s), a centre for the unemployed (1933), and, briefly, a fire station. After the Second World War it was used as a home for retired sailors and serving naval officers. It reopened as a pub in 1965, and was restored to its Victorian-era grandeur in 1968, although only the exterior shell and fenestration are significantly original. The stuccoed building has cast-iron balconies, canopied bow windows (said to be "inspired by the galleries of Elizabethan man-o'-war ships") and a recessed loggia to its riverside elevation.

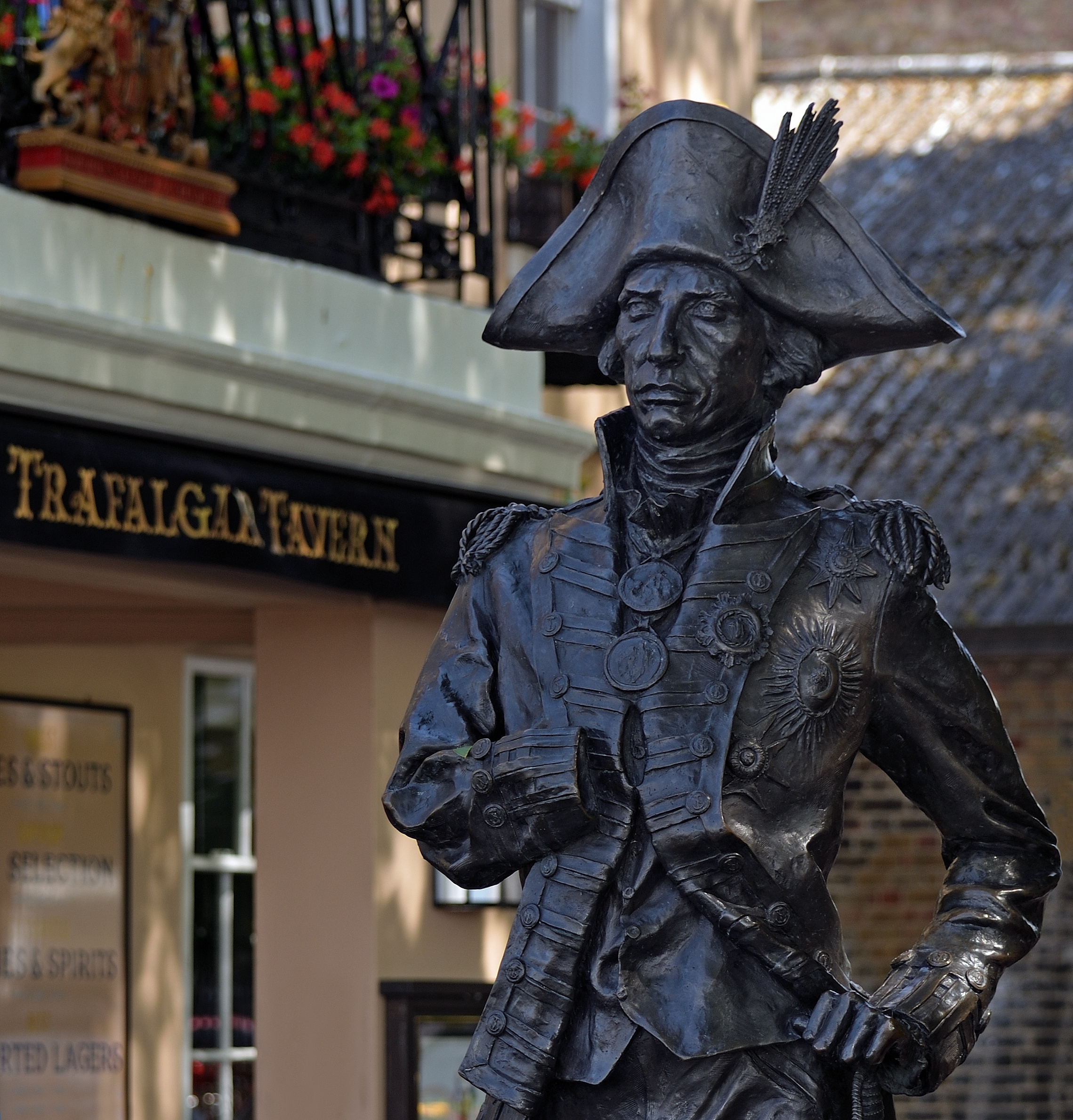
Nelson statue outside Tavern

The Tavern was designated a Grade II listed building on 7 June 1973. The listing noted its interior had been "lavishly restored in the style of 1780, after war damage". It forms a group with the former Curlew Rowing Club premises in Crane Street on the east side of the building.

=== 21st century ===
In 2008 a statue of Horatio Nelson by Lesley Pover, a local artist, was unveiled outside the Tavern. It was commissioned by the pub's owner, Frank Dowling. Pover was provided with a studio behind the Tavern and took two years to complete the statue. She had access to Nelson's life mask and original archives in the nearby National Maritime Museum.

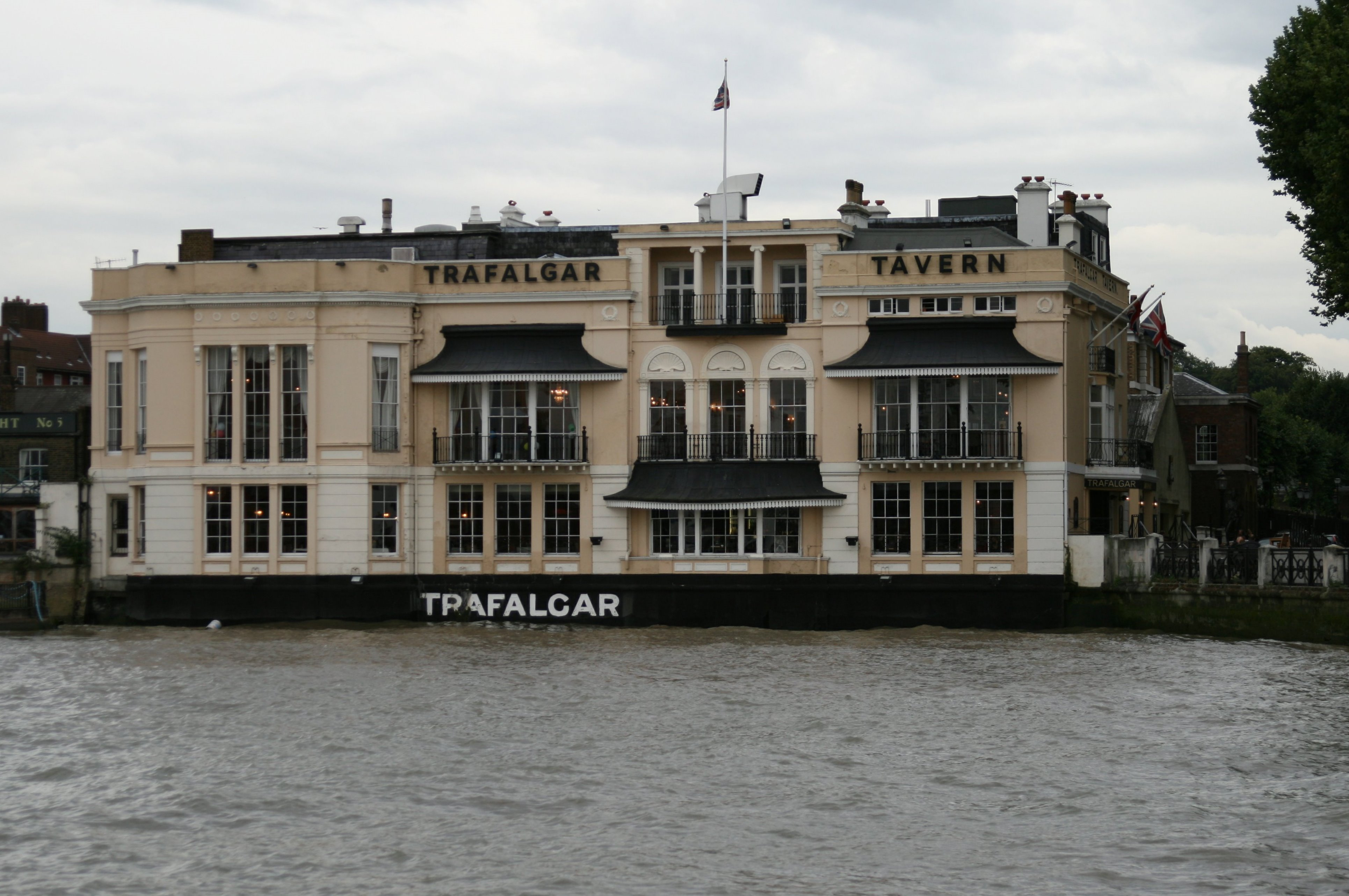
The Trafalgar Tavern (2007)

In 2013 the pub, then one of several venues run by Dowling's Greenwich Inc Trading Ltd, was fined nearly £20,000 for serious breaches of food hygiene regulations. Also in 2013 Dowling was arrested in relation to an alleged £6 million fraud against HM Revenue and Customs, but the prosecution was dropped in 2017. By 2017 Greenwich Inc Trading had collapsed into liquidation, but Dowling retained his involvement with the Tavern and other Greenwich venues through other companies.

In 2019 a wall in the middle of the listed building was removed without the pub's owners asking for planning permission. The creation of an open plan space was condemned by conservation experts. In 2021 local residents voiced concerns about plans to open a night club on upper floors at the Trafalgar. At 35,000 square feet (3,300 m^{2}), the Tavern has been described as the biggest purpose-built pub in the UK.

The Tavern sits within the eastern boundary of the UNESCO Maritime Greenwich World Heritage Site, designated in 1997. In keeping with its location, the interior of the Trafalgar Tavern features numerous maritime-themed artworks and historic artefacts collected by Dowling.

== See also ==
- List of pubs in London
