= Joseph Kay (architect) =

English architect

Joseph Kay (1775–1847) was an English architect, particularly active in the early 19th century, and associated with the layout of central Greenwich and with Hastings. He was one of the original members of the Royal Institute of British Architects, and was elected a fellow in 1834.

== Early career ==
Kay was a pupil of Samuel Pepys Cockerell, and studied European architecture during a trip (1802–1805) alongside Robert Smirke. In 1807, he married Sarah Henrietta Porden (1785–1859), the eldest daughter of architect William Porden; he was assistant to Porden during the building of the second Eaton Hall near Chester, Cheshire (1804–1812). One of his earliest work in his own right was interior design of the Assembly Rooms in Clifton, Bristol, c.1811.

== Professional practice ==
In London, as surveyor to the Foundling Hospital, he designed houses on the east side of Mecklenburgh Square (1810–21), and, as clerk of works to Greenwich Hospital, he remodelled the town centre (creating Nelson Street, College Approach and the Market) in Greenwich (1829); the nearby Trafalgar Tavern (1837) is also his work. In Edinburgh he designed the Post Office in Waterloo Place. His masterpiece was Pelham Crescent with the Church of St Mary-in-the-Castle in the centre, in Hastings, Sussex (1824–1828), built for Thomas Pelham, 2nd Earl of Chichester; Colvin described it:

"The church is top-lit and has an Ionic prostyle portico, while beneath the terrace in front of the whole composition is an ingenious structure intended for shops and services."

Other buildings by Kay in Hastings also survive, including the Cupola, Minnis Rock and Belmont House.

He was also responsible for laying out the Thornhill Estate in Barnsbury, Islington from 1813 onwards.

== Family ==
Kay and his wife had at least eight children (two boys and six girls). Their eldest son, William Porden Kay (1809–1897) also became an architect, emigrating to Australia in 1842 to become a Director of Public Works, and designing Hobart's Government House. The second son, Joseph Henry Kay (1815-1875), became a naval officer and one of Australia's first geophysicists, a foundation member of the Royal Society of Tasmania and a fellow of the Royal Society (elected on 26 February 1846 for his work on geomagnetism).

Kay died at his residence, 6 Gower Street, Bedford Square, London on 7 December 1847, aged 72 and was buried at the Foundling Hospital Chapel, London.
