= 1936–37 Rugby Union County Championship =

English rugby union competition

1936–37 County Championship
- Countries: England
- Champions: Gloucestershire (9th title)
- Runners-up: East Midlands

The 1936–37 Rugby Union County Championship was the 44th edition of England's premier rugby union club competition at the time.

Gloucestershire won the competition for the ninth time after defeating East Midlands in the final.

== Final ==
13 March 1937

Gloucestershire	5–0	East Midlands
Try: Morris; Con: Parker

Bristol
Referee: A S Bear (Durham)

Grahame Parker	Gloucester
T G Baynam	Bristol
F E Edwards	Gloucester
E L Phillips	Gloucester
R E Hook	Gloucester
R E Morris	Gloucester
P W Redwood	Bristol
C R Murphy	Bristol
J P Haskins	Bristol
W H Woodward	Bristol
D Cummins	Bristol
J A Bear	Gloucester
G Harris	Bristol
Alfred Carpenter	Gloucester
F W Tucker	Bristol

W T Taylor	Northampton
Arthur Butler	Harlequins
John Tallent	Blackheath
J G Rogers	Bedford
Victor Lyttle	Bedford
Gordon Sturtridge	Northampton
Paul Cooke	Oxford University
J G Cook	Bedford
R Willsher	Bedford
Bill Weston	Northampton
John Dicks	Northampton
R G Hurrell	Northampton
G T Dancer	Bedford
H Norfolk	Northampton
Ray Longland	Northampton

== See also ==
- English rugby union system
- Rugby union in England
