= 1933–34 Rugby Union County Championship =

English rugby union competition

1933–34 County Championship
- Countries: England
- Champions: East Midlands (1st title)
- Runners-up: Gloucestershire

The 1933–34 Rugby Union County Championship was the 41st edition of England's premier rugby union club competition at the time.

East Midlands won the competition for the first time after defeating Gloucestershire in the final.

== Final ==
10 March 1934

East Midlands	10–0	Gloucestershire
Try: Matthews, Tallent; Drop: Slow

Franklin's Gardens, Northampton
Referee: J G Bott (London)

R C Baillon	Northampton
A R Chorlton	Northampton
John Tallent	Blackheath
J H Treen	Northampton
T D Thevenard	Bedford
Charles Slow	Leicester
Bernard Gadney	Leicester
Bill Weston	Northampton
A D Matthews	Northampton
F Garratt	Northampton
T Harris	Northampton
John Dicks	Northampton
Ray Longland	Northampton
R T Perkins	Bedford
N A York	Northampton

Harold Boughton	Gloucester
R James	Gloucester
Don Burland	Bristol
J C Brooks	Gloucester
Christopher Tanner	Gloucester
D Meadows	Gloucester
C Fifield	Gloucester
C Murphy	Bristol
Arthur Payne	Bristol
J Williams	Gloucester
C A L Richards	Clifton
K Salmon	Cross Keys
E Comley	Gloucester
Alfred Carpenter	Gloucester
F Tucker	Bristol

== See also ==
- English rugby union system
- Rugby union in England
