= Henry Weston (rugby union) =

England international rugby union player

- Full name: Henry Thomas Franklin Weston
- Born: 9 July 1869 Potterspury, England
- Died: 5 April 1955 (aged 85) Towcester, England
- School: Kingston School, Northampton
- Notable relative: Bill Weston (son)
- Occupation: Local councillor

Rugby union career
- Position: Forward
International career
Years	Team	Apps	(Points)
1901	England	1	(0)

Henry Thomas Franklin Weston (9 July 1869 – 5 April 1955) was an English international rugby union player.

== Biography ==
Weston was born in Potterspury and raised in the nearby town of Yardley Gobion, where his maternal ancestors first settled in the 15th century. He attended Kingston School in Northampton.

A forward, Weston played his rugby for Northampton. He represented East Midlands and was an England reserve on several occasions before getting his only opportunity in 1901, deputising for an injured John Daniell in a Calcutta Cup match against Scotland. His son Bill Weston had a longer England career, with 16 caps.

Weston served 35 years on the Northamptonshire County Council and was alderman from 1936 to 1954.

== See also ==
- List of England national rugby union players
