= Queen's Oak =

Tree in Northamptonshire, England

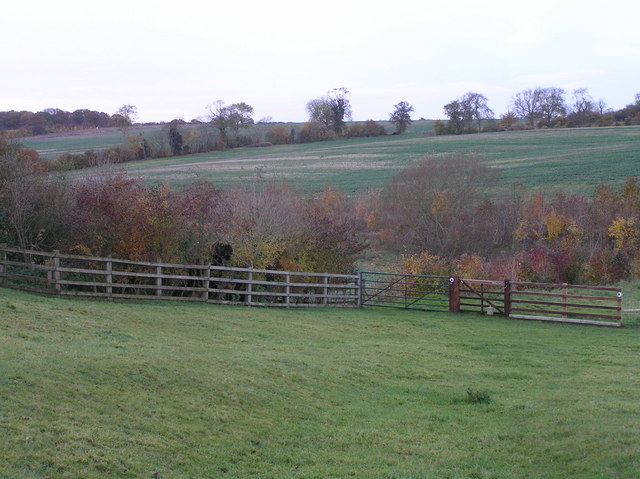
- The blackened stump of the tree photographed in 2006
- Location: Near Potterspury, Northamptonshire
- Date felled: August 1997

The Queen's Oak was a tree located near Potterspury in Northamptonshire. It is traditionally the site of the first meeting between Elizabeth Woodville and her future husband, Edward IV. The tree was badly burnt in 1994 and died in 1997.

== Association with Edward IV ==
The tree is traditionally regarded as the spot of the first meeting between Edward IV, king of England and leader of the Yorkist faction in the War of the Roses, and Elizabeth Woodville, the widow of John Grey of Groby, a Lancastrian commander. The meeting is said to have taken place on 13 April 1464 and the couple were married in secret just 18 days later. The marriage was controversial at the time as Woodville was a Lancastrian, a commoner, brought no dowry and already had children. In spite of the legend, the couple may have met earlier when Woodville's parents served Edward's father in Normandy or when Edward stayed in Groby in 1461; however, the first recorded meeting is certainly 13 April 1464. Woodville is said to have waited under the oak for Edward to pass by, to seek to plead for her sons' confiscated inheritances to be restored. The tree at this time stood in Whittlebury/Whittlewood Forest, a royal hunting ground. The fabled meeting under the tree was featured in the first episode of the 2013 BBC Series The White Queen.

== Later history ==
The tree became known as the Queen's Oak for its association with the legend. It stood around half a mile to the north-east of Watling Street, between Potterspury and Paulerspury in Northamptonshire. At one point it formed part of the boundary of Potterspury Park. The tree stood to the rear of the Pottersbury Lodge and several acorns from it were recovered and planted on the estate by Henry Newton in the mid-19th century. By 1879 it measured 8.83 metres (29.0 ft) ingirth and its hollow trunk could accommodate 18 people. By 1937 an avenue of lime trees had been planted leading up to the Queen's Oak.

The lodge came into the ownership of the Northamptonshire County Council in the 1950s. The lodge was sold in 1958 and became Potterspury Lodge School but much of the estate was retained as two farms which were let out. The Queen's Oak farm was sold to a tenant in 1996.

The Queen's Oak caught fire in 1994; it was badly damaged, though a solitary branch survived until August 1997. Tests carried out at this time suggested an age of just 340 years for the oak, meaning it was planted around 1650.

== See also ==
- Queen Elizabeth's Oak (disambiguation)
