= Arthur Payne (rugby union) =

England international rugby union player

- Full name: Arthur Thomas Payne
- Born: 11 November 1907 Bristol, England
- Died: 6 June 1968 (aged 60) Bristol, England

Rugby union career
- Position: Back-row
International career
Years	Team	Apps	(Points)
1935	England	2	(0)

Arthur Thomas Payne (11 November 1907 – 6 June 1968) was an English international rugby union player.

Born in Bristol, Payne was a back-row forward, produced by hometown club Dings Crusaders.

Payne was playing for Bristol when he gained an England call up for the 1935 Home Nations Championship, taking the place of Dudley Kemp at number eight. He won two caps, forming a back-row with Gordon Cridlan and Bill Weston, for matches against Ireland at Twickenham and Scotland at Murrayfield.

== See also ==
- List of England national rugby union players
