= Greenwich Park =

Royal Park and former hunting park in Greenwich, London

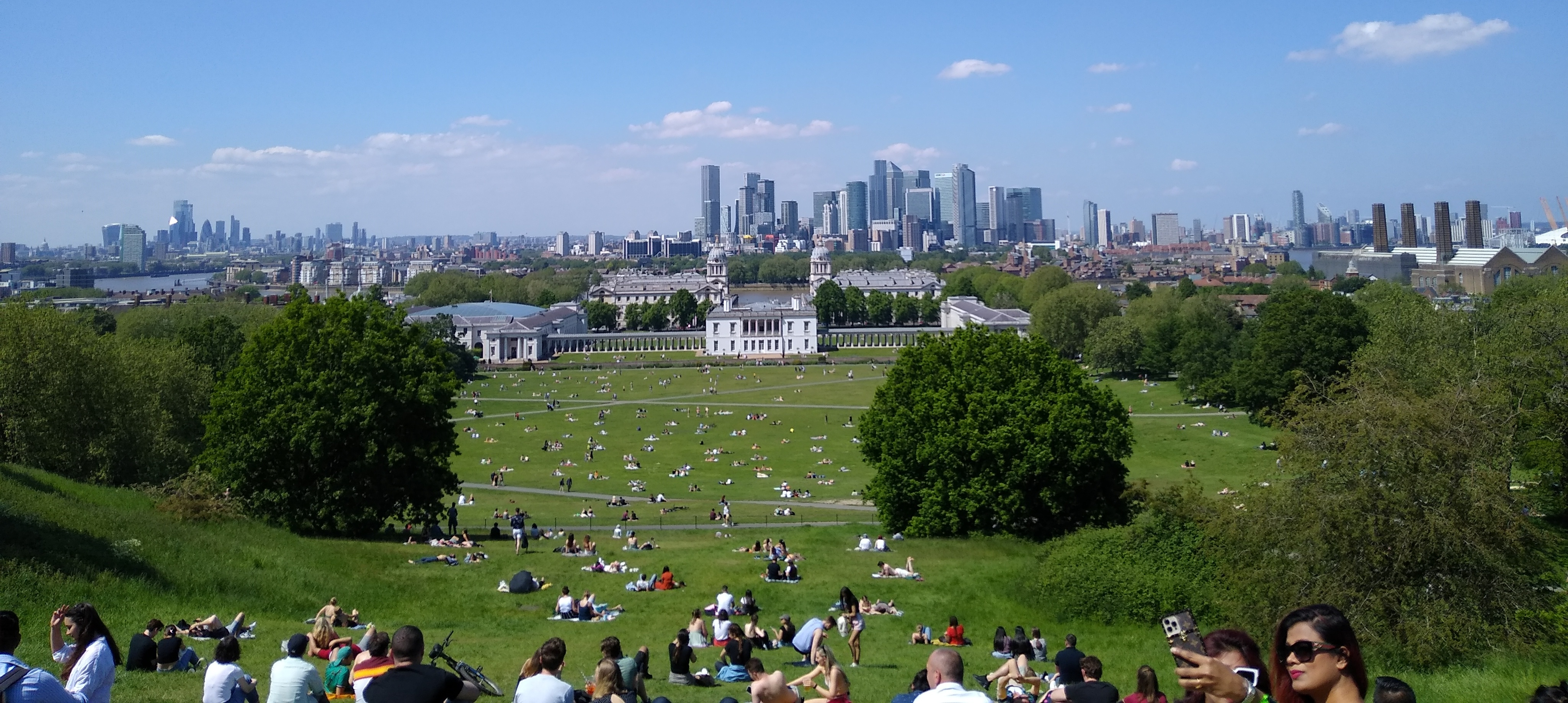
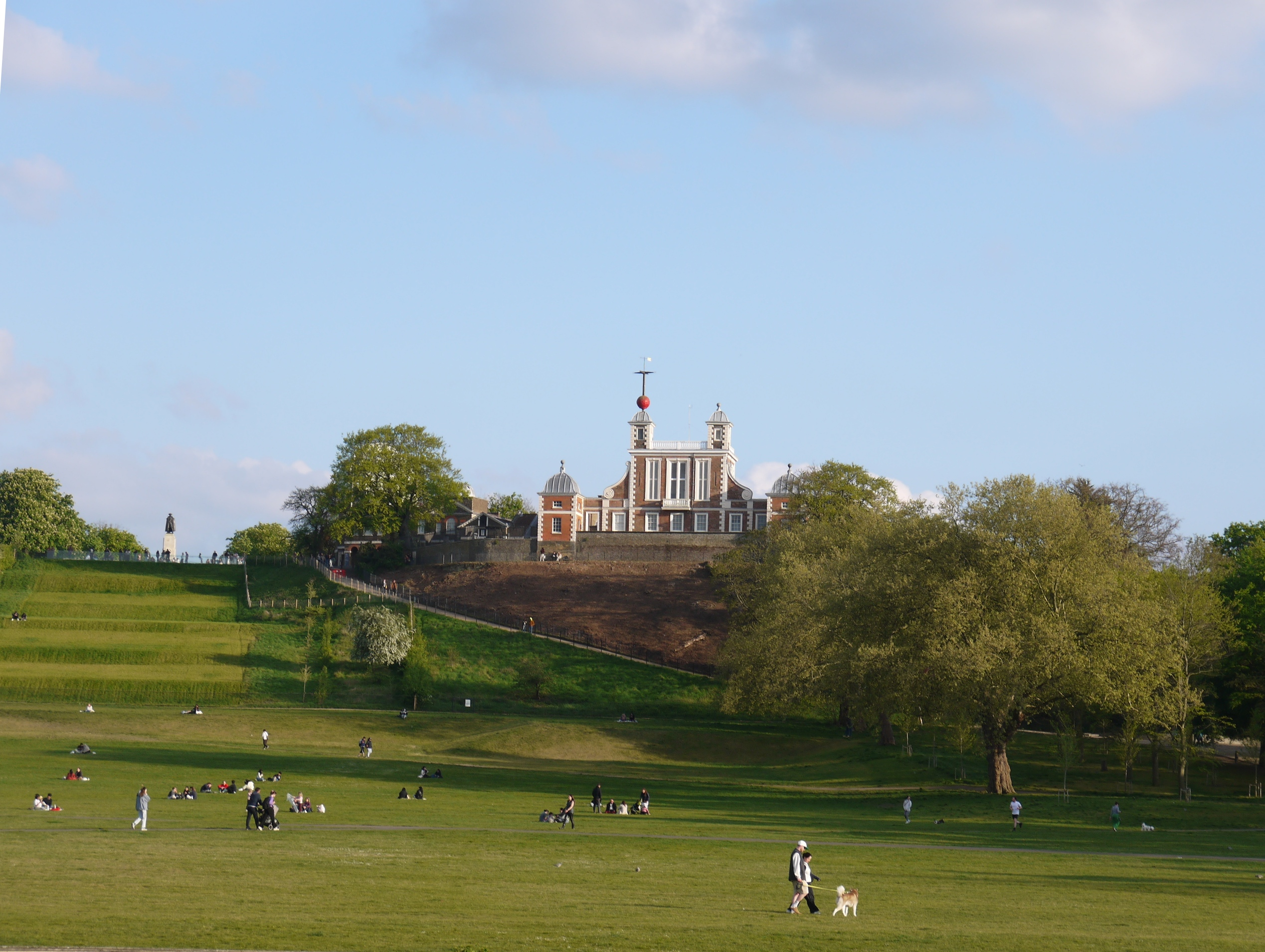
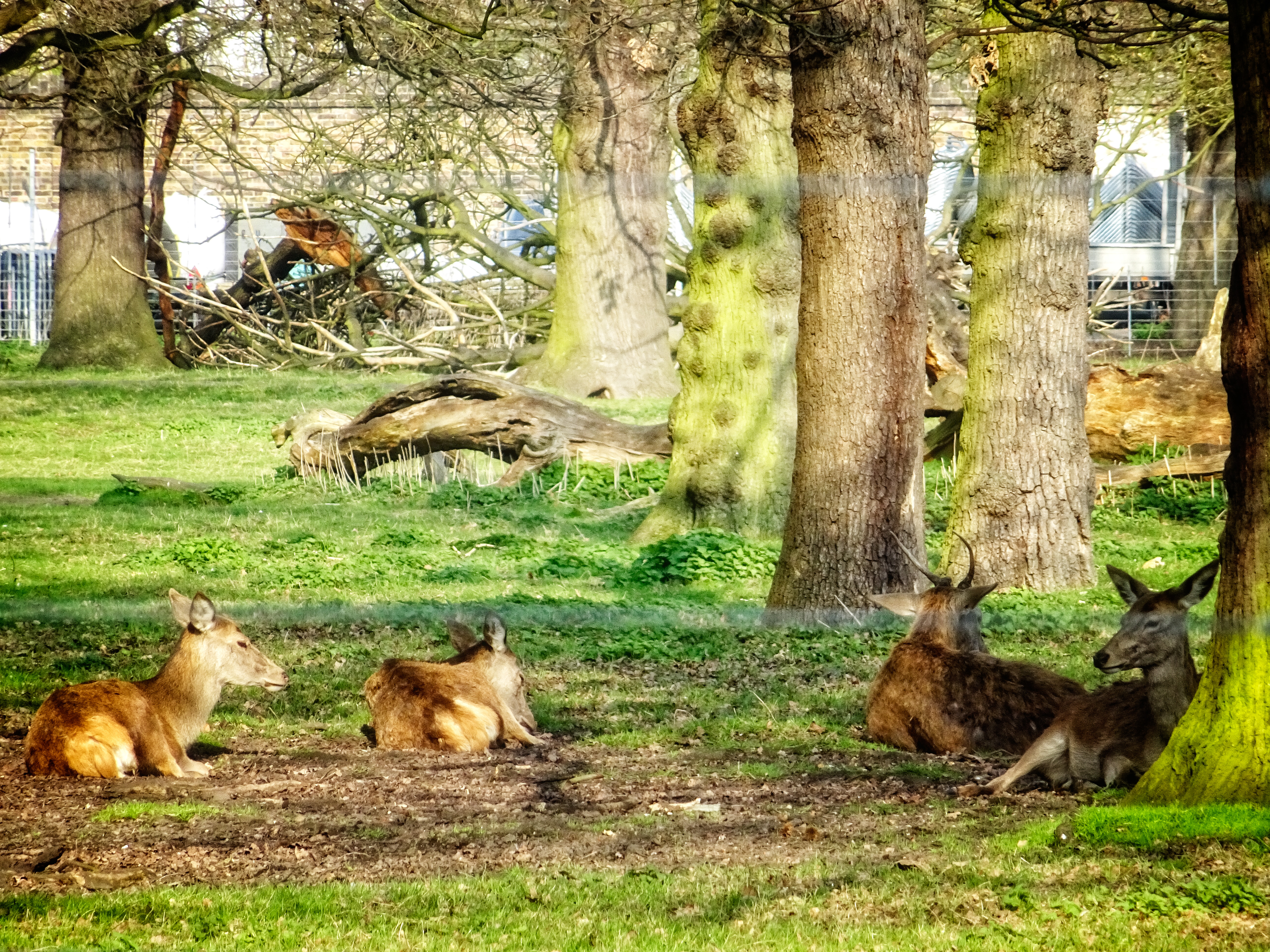
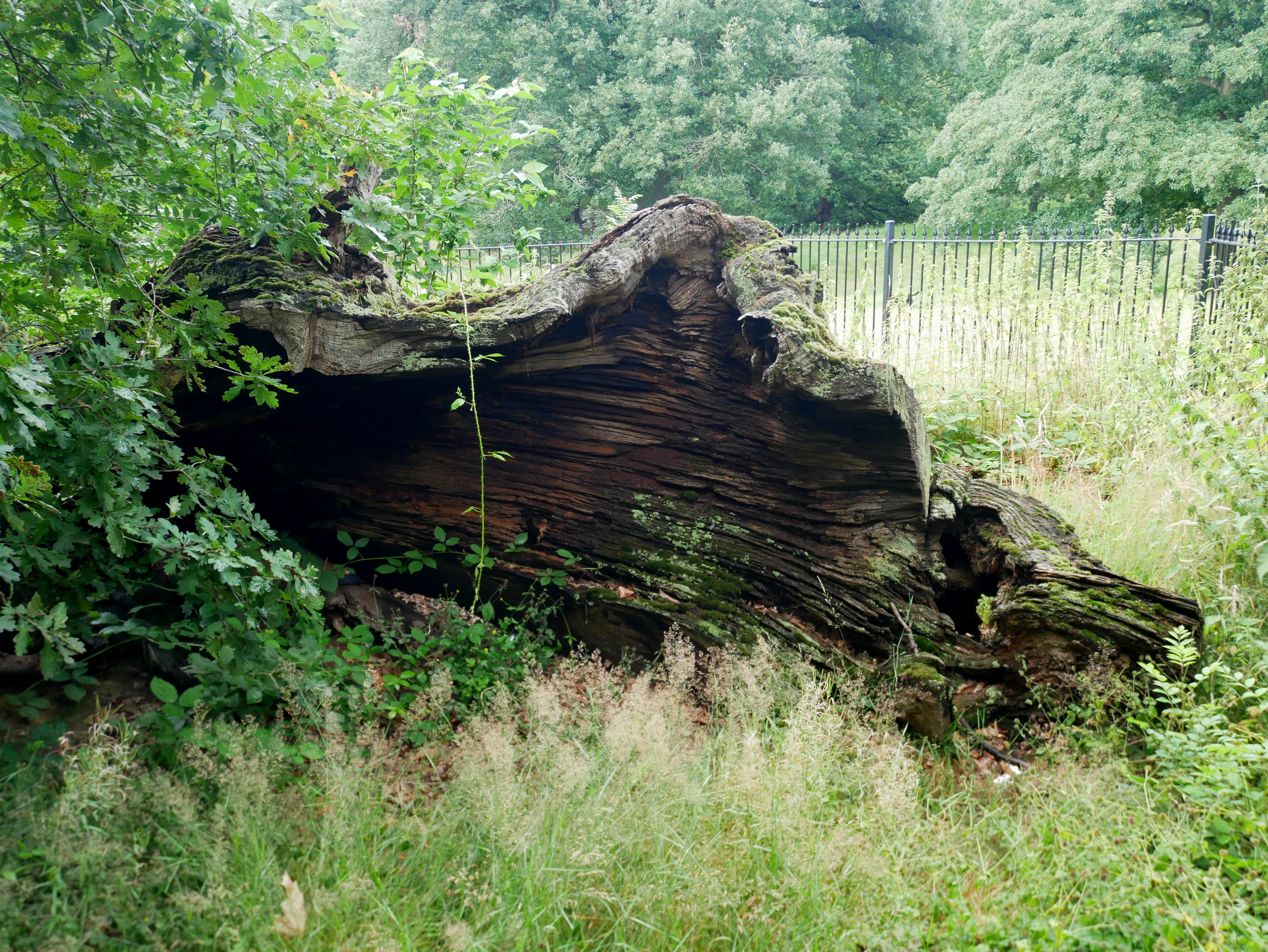
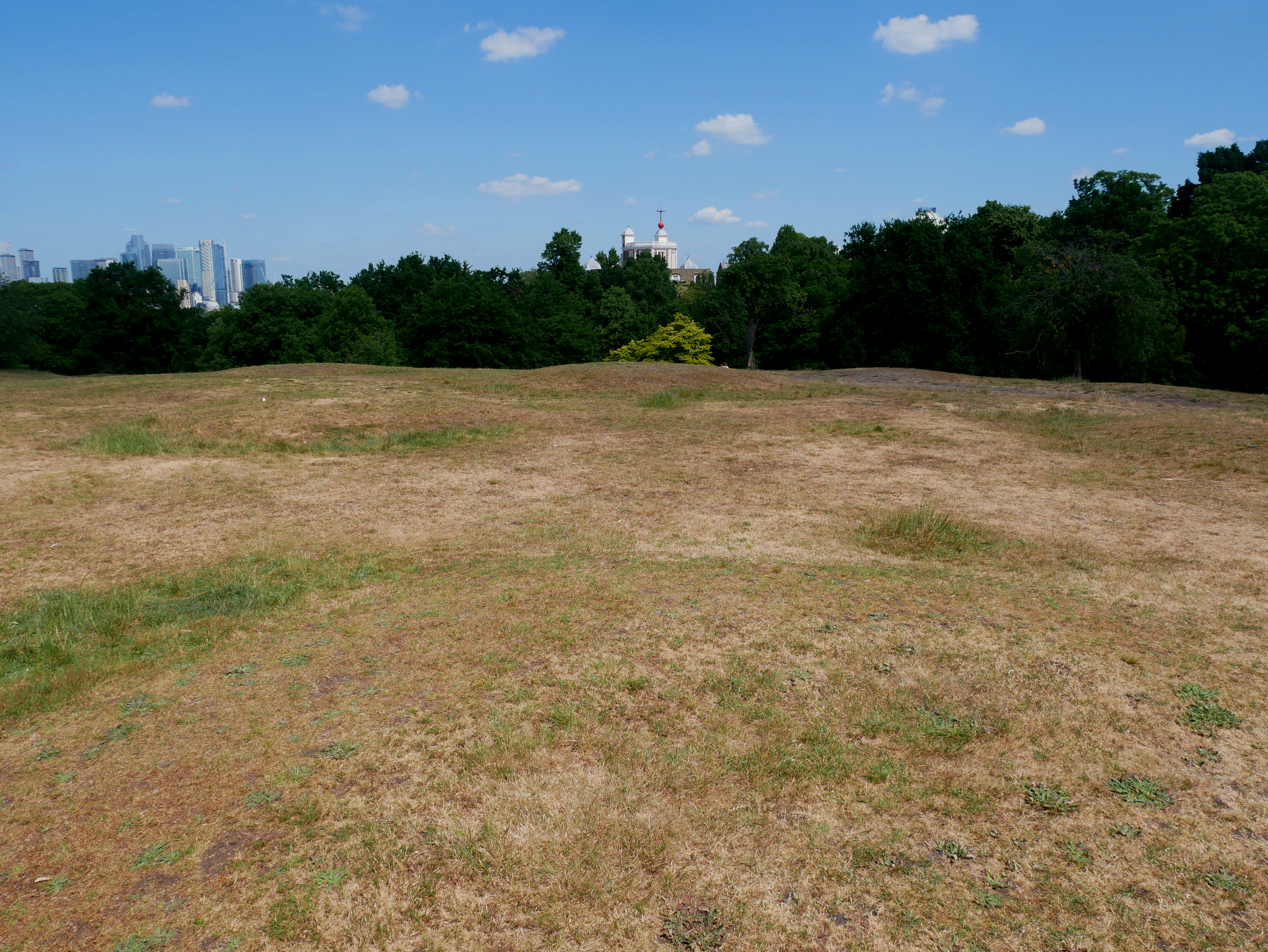
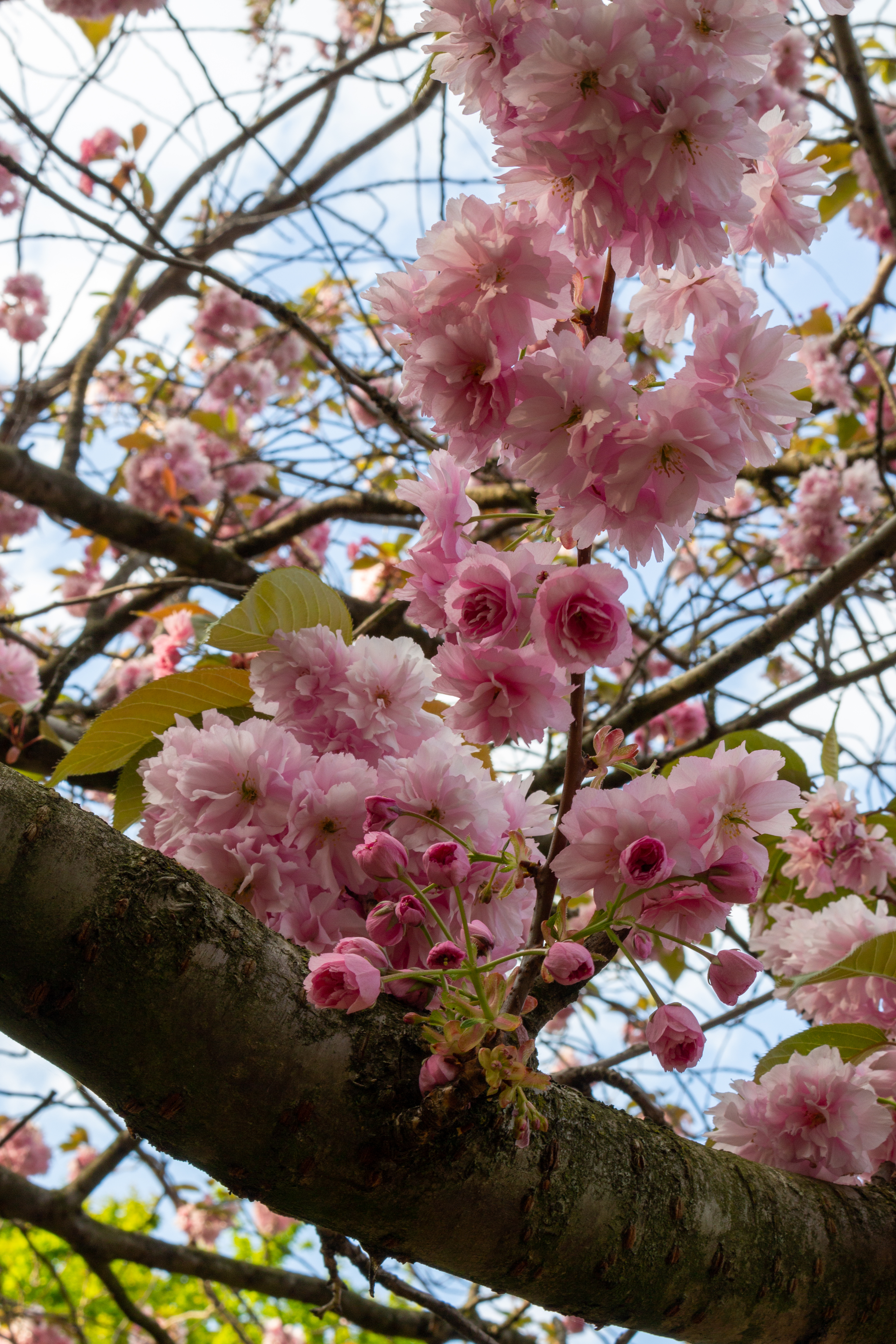
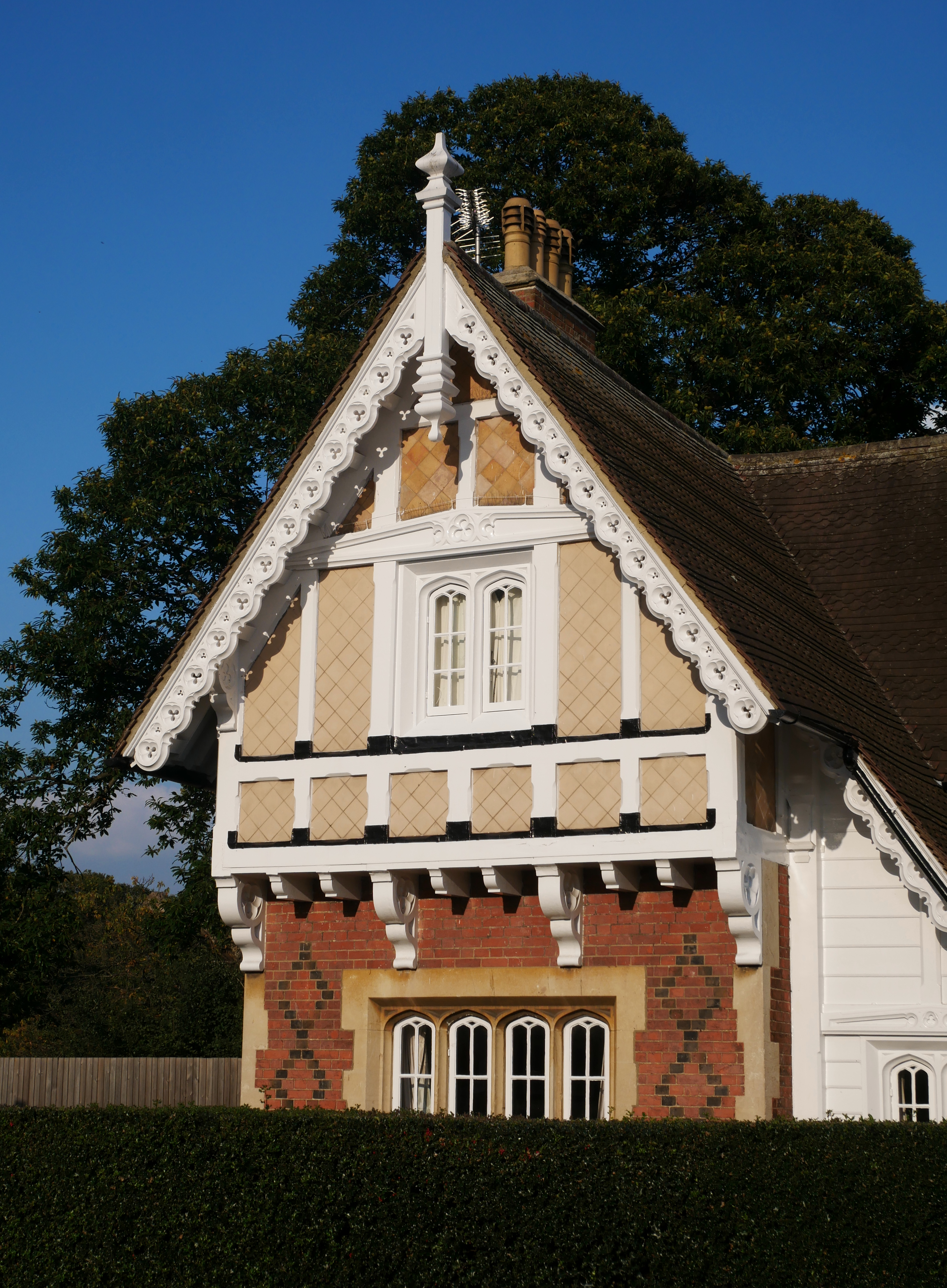
- Queen's House and the Old Royal Naval College (front), and Canary Wharf (back) Royal Observatory Deer in the park Queen Elizabeth's Oak Medieval barrows Cherry blossom Blackheath Gate Lodge

- Location within Royal Borough of Greenwich
- Type: Public park
- Location: Greenwich, London, England
- Coordinates: 51°28′38″N 0°00′00″E
- Area: 74.5 hectares (184 acres)
- Created: 1433 (Note: The park was first enclosed and established in 1433 by Humphrey, Duke of Gloucester. The park has been settled since Roman times.)
- Operator: The Royal Parks
- Public transit: Cutty Sark; Greenwich; Maze Hill
- Website: Official website

National Register of Historic Parks and Gardens
- Official name: Greenwich Park
- Designated: 1 October 1987
- Reference no.: 1000174

Greenwich Park is a former hunting park in Greenwich and one of the largest single green spaces in south-east London. One of the eight Royal Parks of London, and the first to be enclosed (in 1433), it covers 74 hectares (180 acres), and is part of the Greenwich World Heritage Site. Surrounding the hilltop Royal Observatory (opened in 1676) and straddling the Greenwich Prime Meridian, it commands elevated views over the River Thames, the Isle of Dogs and the City of London.

The park is open year-round, and incorporates flower gardens as well as grassy spaces, a children's playground, cafés and other amenities, a bandstand, a boating lake, a pond, wooded areas, and a wildlife habitat called "The Wilderness". The park also contains Roman and Anglo-Saxon remains, and is listed Grade I on the Register of Historic Parks and Gardens; in 2020, it was awarded a National Lottery grant to restore historic features and add new visitor facilities. It hosted Olympic and Paralympic equestrian events during the London 2012 Summer Olympics, and accommodates runners prior to the start of the annual London Marathon.

== History ==
=== 15th–18th centuries ===
The estate of some 200 acres (81 ha) was originally owned by Saint Peter's Abbey, Ghent, but reverted to the Crown in 1427 and was given by Henry VI to his uncle Humphrey, Duke of Gloucester. He built a house by the river, Bella Court, and a small castle, called Greenwich Castle or Duke Humphrey's Tower, on the hill. The former evolved first into the Tudor Palace of Placentia and then into the Queen's House and Greenwich Hospital. Greenwich Castle, by now in disrepair, was chosen for the site of the Royal Observatory by Charles II in 1675, on the advice of Sir Christopher Wren.

As a result of this decision, the Greenwich Prime Meridian crosses Greenwich Park, passing due north and south of the Royal Observatory. A stainless steel strip in the Observatory's courtyard marks the line; it is also marked on the wall of a path just north of the Observatory and there are wall plaques just outside the park, in Chesterfield Walk to the south and Park Vista to the north. In 1884 it was agreed to be the official Prime Meridian of the world, a status it held for a century until it was superseded by the related IERS Reference Meridian, which runs parallel to the Greenwich Meridian some 102 metres to its east.

In the 15th century, the park was mostly heathland and probably used for hawking. In the next century, deer were introduced by Henry VIII for hunting, and a small collection of deer was maintained in an area to the south east. James I enclosed the park with a brick wall, 12 feet (3.7 m) high and two miles (3 km) long at a cost of £2000, much of which remains and defines the modern boundary. A small section of the boundary wall in the southwest corner of the park was formerly part of Montagu House, one time residence of Caroline of Brunswick, demolished in 1815, though Queen Caroline's bath (c. 1806) is preserved inside the park. James I also commissioned the first modern ice house in 1619 in the Park.

In the 17th century, the park was landscaped, possibly by André Le Nôtre who is known at least to have designed plans for it. The public were first allowed into the park during the 18th century. Samuel Johnson visited the park in 1763 and commented "Is it not fine?". From 1730 to 1857, around 250,000 Londoners would attend the bi-annual Greenwich fair (held on May Day and Whitsun); Observatory Hill and nearby One Tree Hill were used on public holidays for mass 'tumbling'.

=== 1800–present day ===
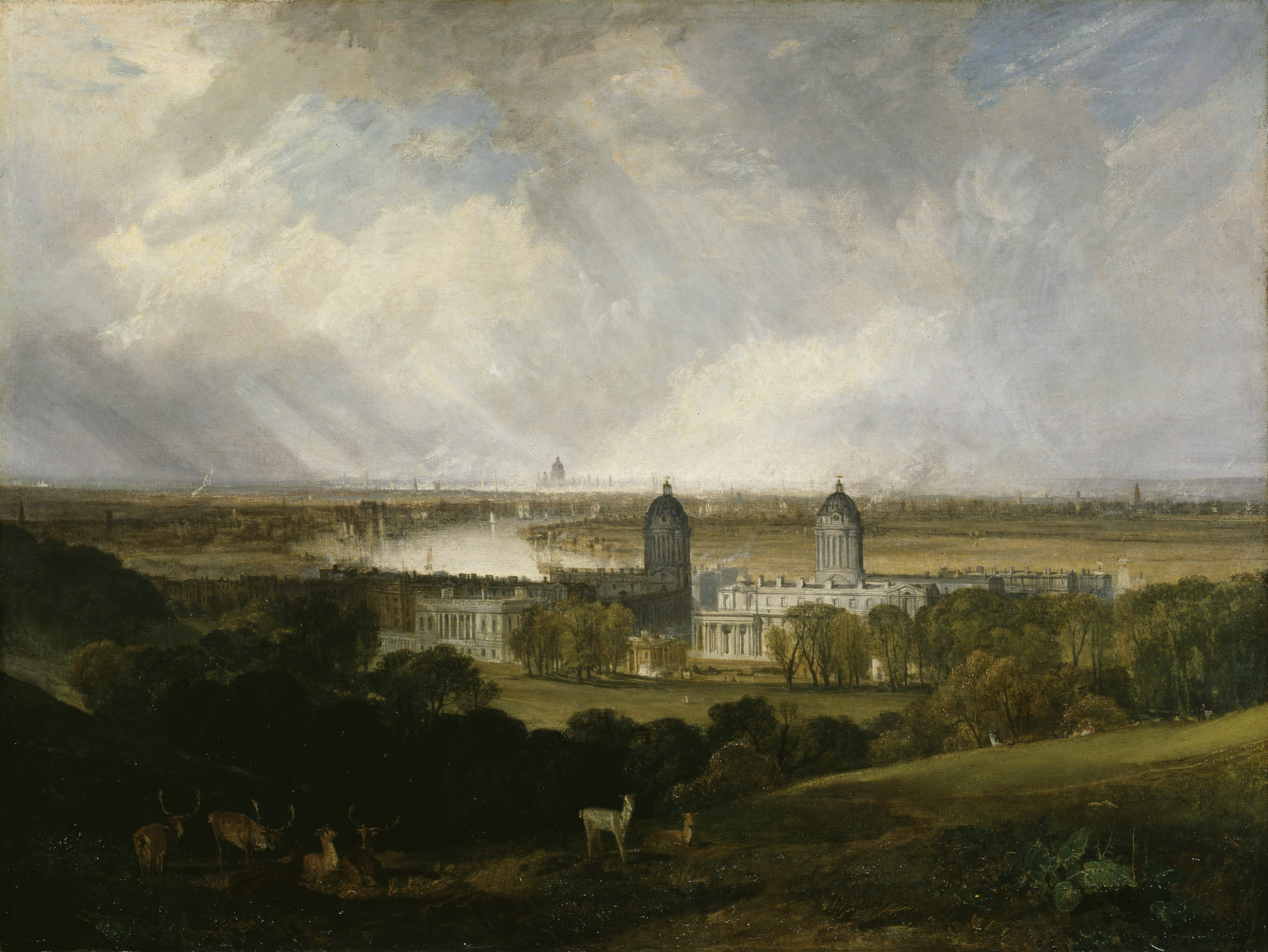
London from Greenwich Park, in 1809, by J.M.W. Turner

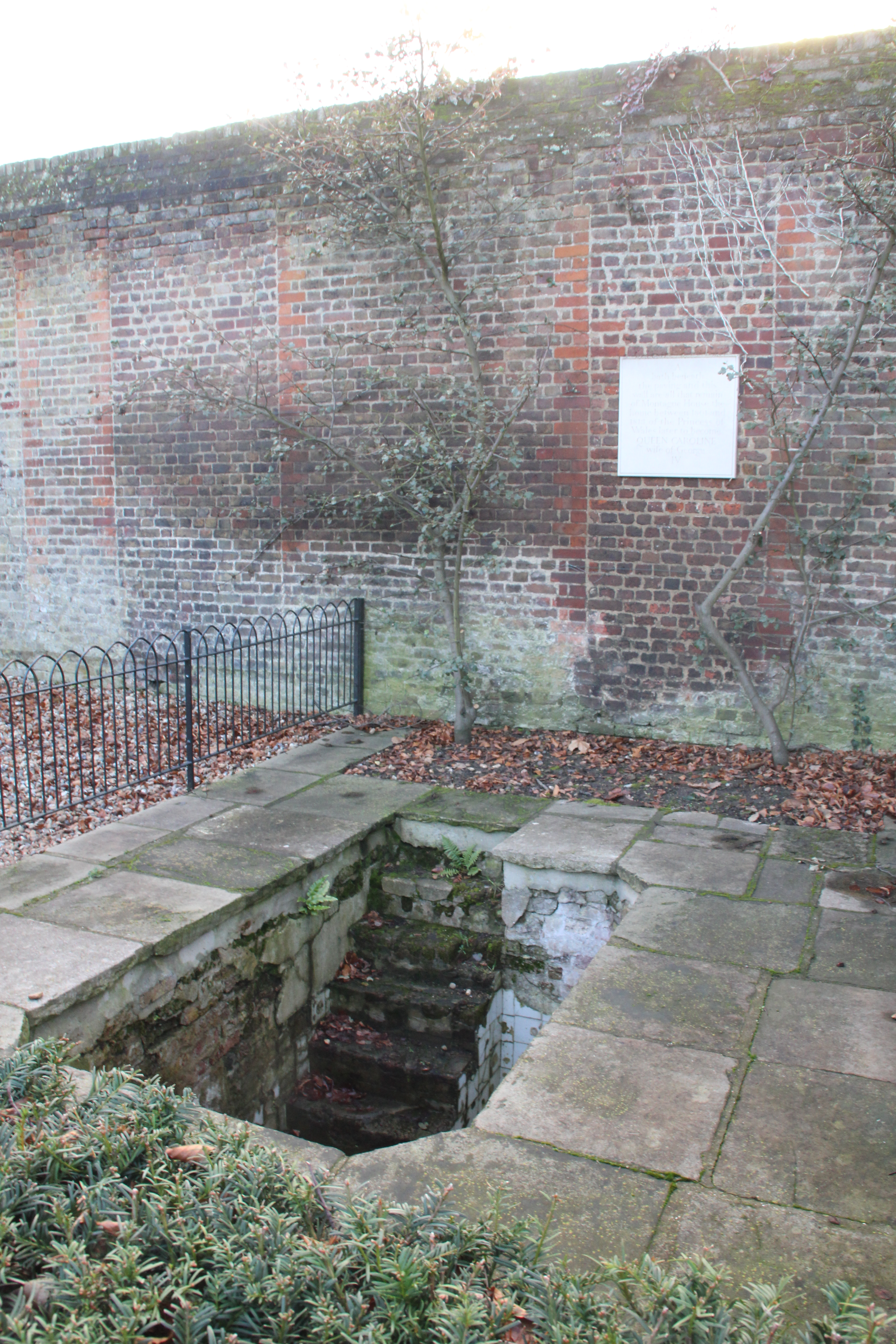
Queen Caroline's Bath, Greenwich Park

In the 1830s, a railway was nearly driven through the middle of the lower park on a viaduct but the scheme was defeated by intense local opposition. However, the London and Greenwich Railway was later extended beneath the ground via a cut-and-cover tunnel link between Greenwich and Maze Hill which opened in 1878 (the tunnel alignment is on the north side of the park's northern boundary wall, running beneath the gardens of the National Maritime Museum and Queen's House).

In 1888, the park got a station of its own when Greenwich Park railway station was opened. The station was not successful, with most passengers preferring the older Greenwich station, and in 1917 Greenwich Park station and the associated line closed. On 15 February 1894, a man died after a bomb explosion in Greenwich Park, close to the Observatory. The victim, Martial Bourdin, was a 26-year-old Frenchman with links to the anarchist Club Autonomie, and was carrying the device when it exploded prematurely. The incident inspired Joseph Conrad's The Secret Agent.

During the two World Wars, allotments were sited on the northern edge of the park, south of the Queen's House. Agreement for 139 plots for local families to grow vegetables was reached in March 1918, with tenants paying 7s 6d a year each for their plots. Tenants kept their allotments until February 1921 when the park returned to its former use. From 1939, the park was again used for wartime allotments. During World War II anti-aircraft guns were positioned in the park's flower garden with some tree tops removed to clear the line of fire.

During the London 2012 Summer Olympics, Greenwich Park was the venue for the Olympic equestrian events and for the riding and running parts of the modern pentathlon events. It was also the venue for the Paralympic equestrian events. The use of Greenwich Park for Olympic equestrian events had earlier caused some tension between the London Organising Committee for the Olympic and Paralympic Games 2012 (LOCOG) and some local area residents. A community action group, NOGOE (No to Greenwich Olympic Equestrian Events), believed Greenwich Park was not a suitable venue for the events and started an (ultimately unsuccessful) petition to get the equestrian events relocated; by February 2009 this had gathered over 12,000 signatures. Olympic use of the park was approved by Greenwich Council in March 2010, with test events held the following year.

In 2021, a £12 million four-year project, 'Greenwich Park Revealed', was instigated to reveal, restore, protect and enhance the park's past and current features, enhance the park's biodiversity, and provide better access for people with disabilities. Supported by a grant of £4,517,300 from the National Lottery Heritage Fund and the National Lottery Community Fund, the project remodelled the area around the General Wolfe statue viewpoint, restored the 'Grand Ascent' (a series of giant grass steps, north of the Wolfe statue), restored other landscape features, replanted tree avenues, and added a £1.2m learning centre (designed by Architype) and the Ignatius Sancho Café and other visitor facilities. The project was completed in 2025. Several archaeological investigations were undertaken in parallel with the work, including 2021 and 2022 digs of a Saxon burial mound, a 2023 dig on the site of the 'Grand Ascent', a community excavation of a World War II air-raid shelter east of One Tree Hill, and exploration of the remains of John Pond's Magnetic Observatory, an enclosure built in 1817 to analyse Earth's magnetic field.

== Geography ==
The park is roughly rectangular in plan with sides 1000 metres by 750 metres and oriented with the long sides lying NNW to SSE. In what follows this direction is taken to be N to S for ease of exposition. It is located at grid reference TQ390772. The park is on two levels, with a number of dips and gullies marking the transition between them. The lower level (closest to the National Maritime Museum, Queen's House and, beyond them, the Thames) lies to the north; from there a steep walk uphill reveals the southern part – a flat expanse that is, essentially, an enclosed extension of the plateau of Blackheath.

Roughly in the centre, on the top of the hill, is the Royal Observatory. (Simon Jenkins rated the view of the Royal Hospital with Canary Wharf in the distance as one of the top ten in England). At the northern edge is the National Maritime Museum and Queen's House, and beyond those Greenwich Hospital. To the east is Vanbrugh Castle. To the south is Blackheath and in the south-western corner is the Ranger's House, looking out over the heath. To the west lie the architecturally fine streets of Chesterfield Walk and Croom's Hill.

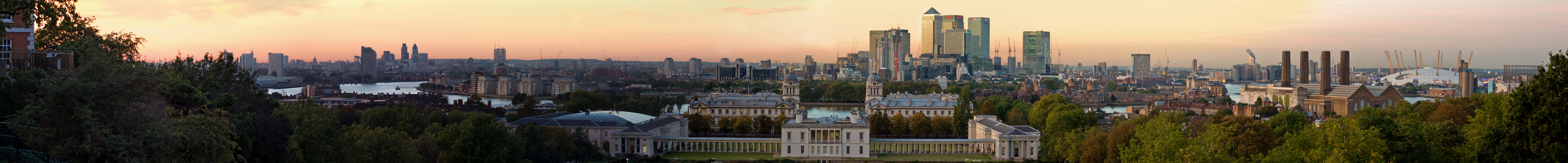
A 2007 panorama of the view of London from the Royal Observatory in Greenwich Park.

== Royal Observatory ==
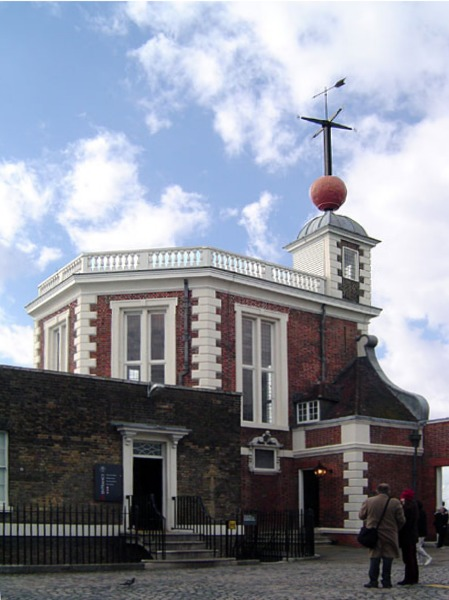
The Royal Observatory with its time ball, which is dropped at 1pm.

The Observatory is on the top of the hill. Outside is a Statue of James Wolfe, who is buried in St Alfege Church, Greenwich, in a small plaza from which there are views across to the former Greenwich Hospital (the Old Royal Naval College, now the University of Greenwich) and then towards the river, the skyscrapers of Canary Wharf, the City of London to the northwest and The O2 Arena to the north.

North-east of the General Wolfe statue is Assessment Point 5A.2, forming one of the 13 protected vistas designated under the London View Management Framework. The protected sightline extends from Greenwich Park to St Paul's Cathedral.

== Amenities ==
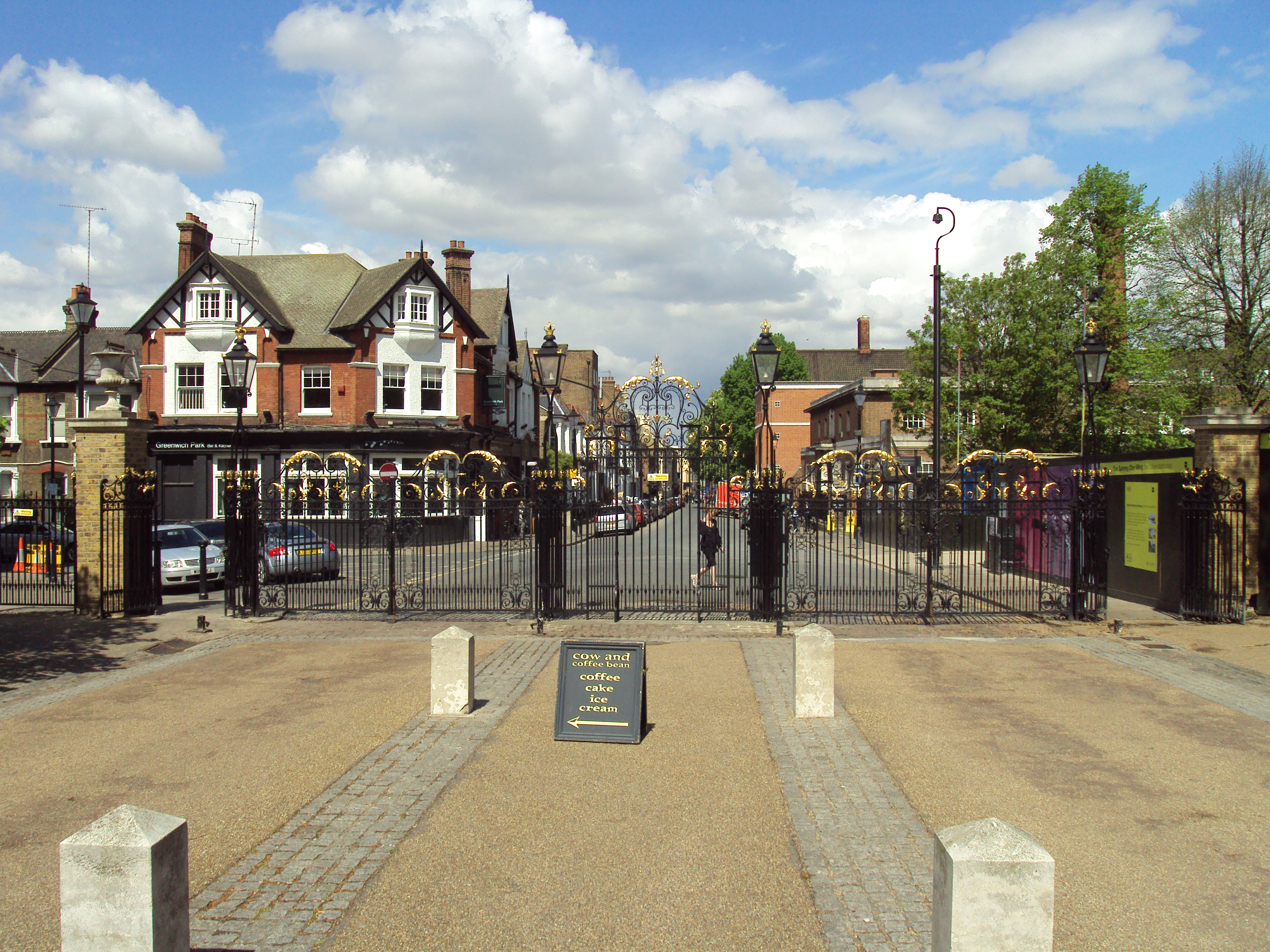
Greenwich Park northern gates, with the Greenwich Tavern just beyond on the left

On the lower level of the park there is a popular children's playground (north-east corner, close to Maze Hill railway station), an adjacent boating lake, and a small orchard ('The Queen's Orchard'). There is also a herb garden (close by entrance to Greenwich town centre).

On the upper level, there is an extensive flower garden with a large duck pond, a rose garden, a cricket pitch, tennis courts, a bandstand, Roman remains, an ancient oak tree (known as Queen Elizabeth's Oak, associated with Queen Elizabeth I) many 17th-century sweet chestnut trees with gnarled, swirling trunks, an enclosure ("The Wilderness") used to house wild deer, and an avenue of cherry trees renowned for their spring blossoms.

West of the Observatory is the garden of the former Astronomer Royal, a peaceful secluded space which is good for picnics and also sometimes used by theatre groups (Midsummer Night's Dream, etc.). On the opposite side (southeast of the Wolfe statue) is the Pavilion Café. There is another, smaller café by the north-west gate, and a snack bar in the children's playground; in March 2024, as part of the 'Greenwich Park Revealed' programme, the Ignatius Sancho Café was opened in a refurbished building by the Vanbrugh Gate on the east side of the park.

It is possible to park (pay and display) in areas along the main roads entering from Blackheath (though it can be busy). Cycle routes criss-cross the park (as do runners, roller-bladers, dog-walkers, etc.). Until 2020, other road traffic (cars and motor-cycles) could use the park road linking Blackheath and Greenwich at peak periods on weekdays. After a trial closure, the road was permanently closed to through traffic in 2022.

== Sport ==
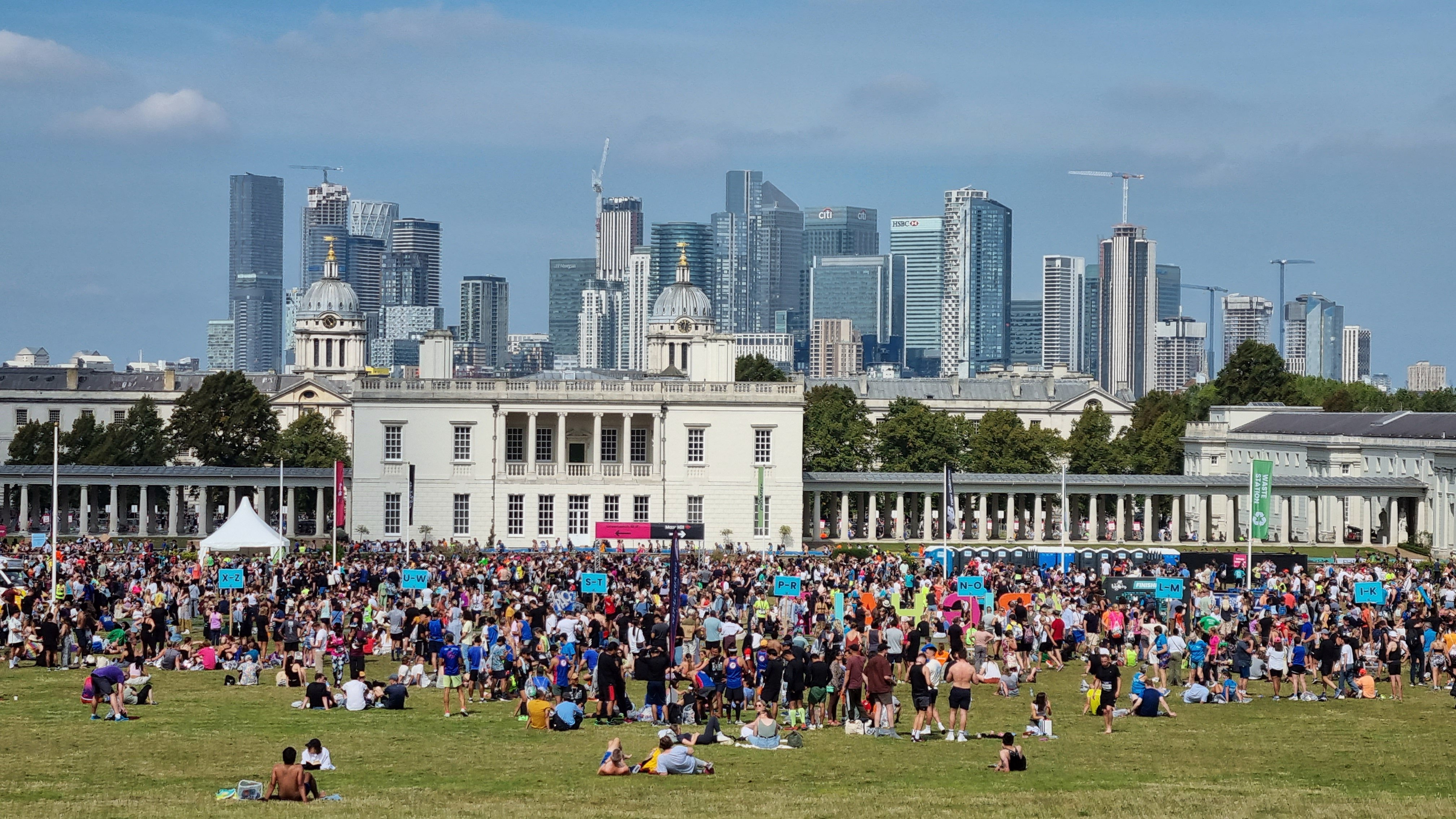
Greenwich Park being used for the 2023 Big Half (a half marathon).

One of three start points for the London Marathon, the 'red start', is located just south of Greenwich Park, in Charlton Way, with runners held in the park before they start. A London half marathon, Run to the Beat, passed through the park from 2008 to 2012; in 2013, the last running of the 13.1-mile event started and finished in the park. Since 2018 the park has also accommodated some of the finish facilities of The Big Half, a half marathon run each September. A 2.62-miles charity 'mini marathon' for children is held each May, and the park also hosts occasional commercially organised 5km and 10km running events. (Note: Greenwich Park does not host a parkrun; the nearest weekly parkrun is at Charlton Park. 'Greenwich parkrun' – the borough's first parkrun, established in 2010 – was held at Avery Hill and was renamed 'Avery Hill parkrun' in March 2025.) The park also staged the start of the final stage of the 2006 Tour of Britain cycle race (3 September). A cricket pitch is maintained in the southwest corner of the park, with an adjacent pavilion. Tennis courts are located to the north of the cricket pitch.

== Greenwich Park in popular culture ==
Greenwich Park was used for outdoor London scenes including representing the Constitution Hill thoroughfare in the 2009 film The Young Victoria starring Emily Blunt and Rupert Friend.

== Gallery ==
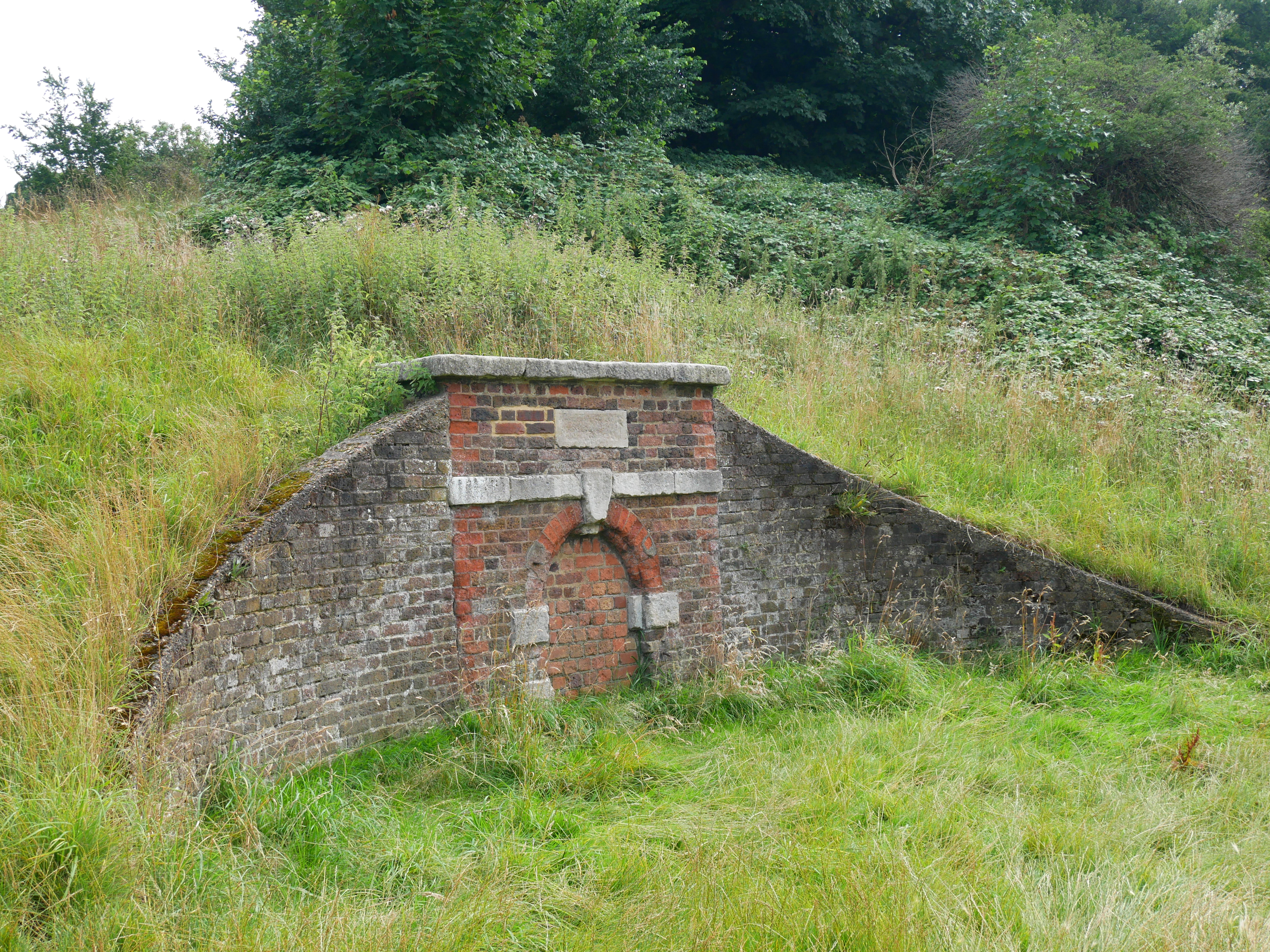
Late 17th or early 18th-century conduit house

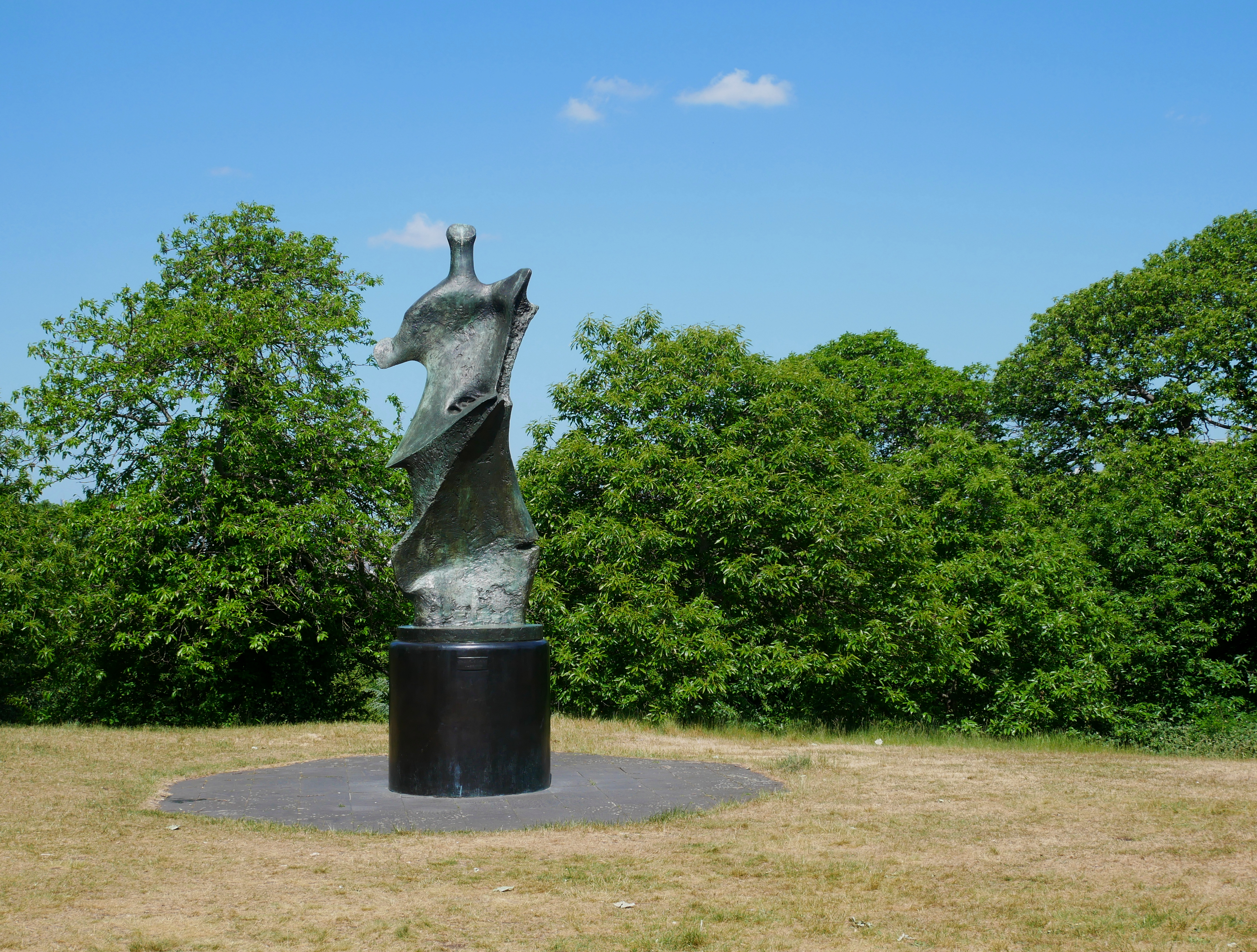
Henry Moore sculpture

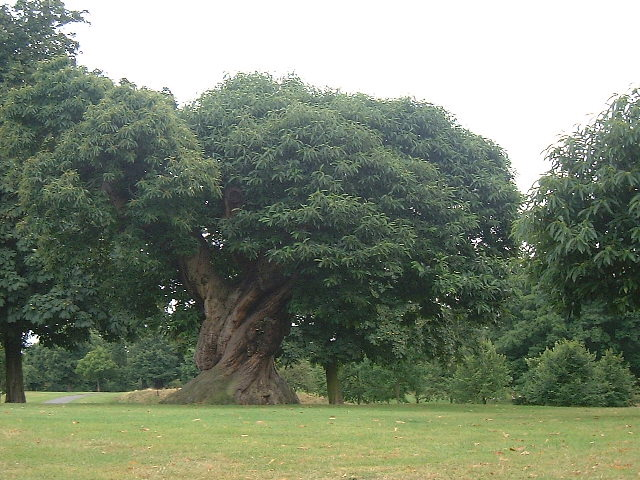
One of the ancient sweet chestnut trees, with distinctive spiralling bark

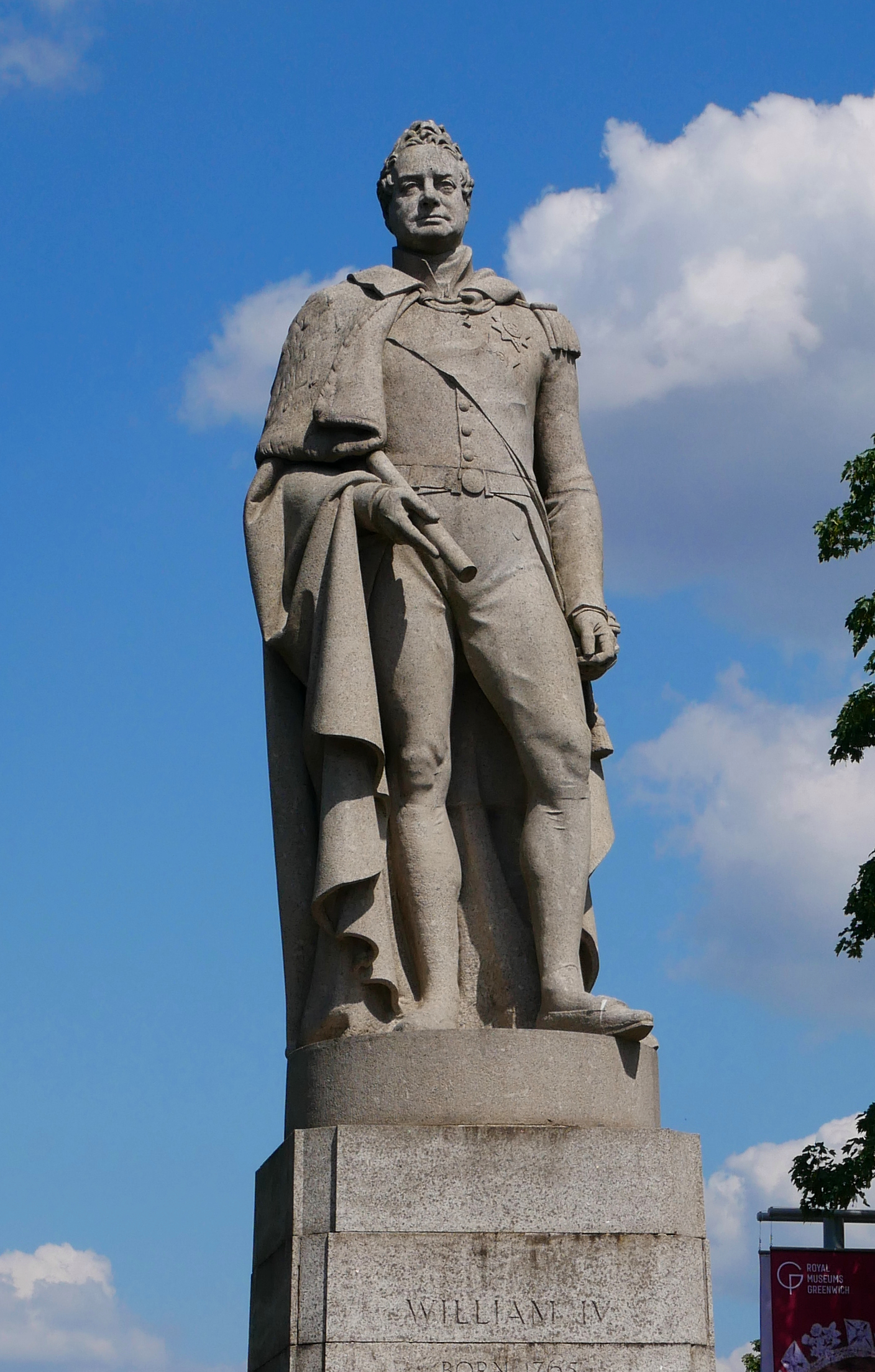
Statue of William IV by Samuel Nixon

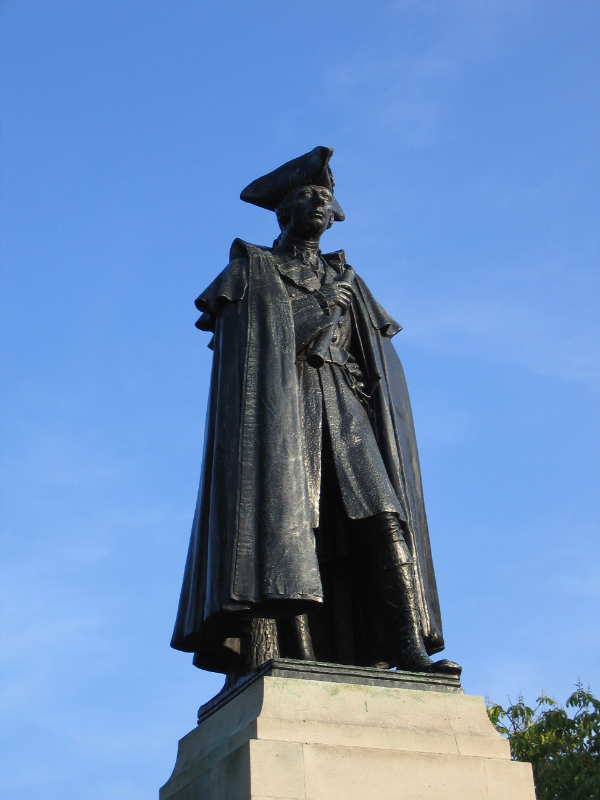
James Wolfe by Robert Tait McKenzie

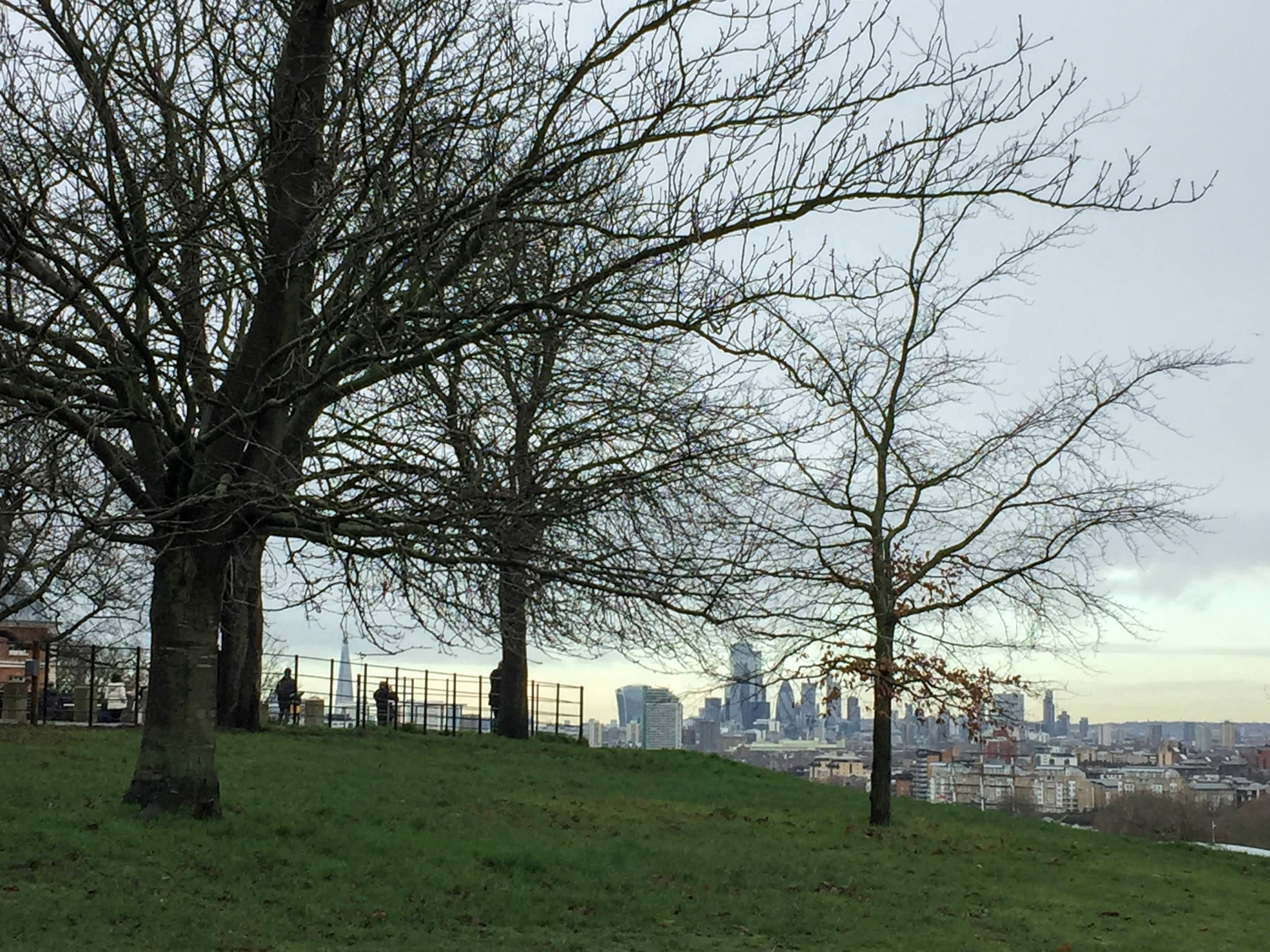
View of the City of London (right) and The Shard (left) from Greenwich Park

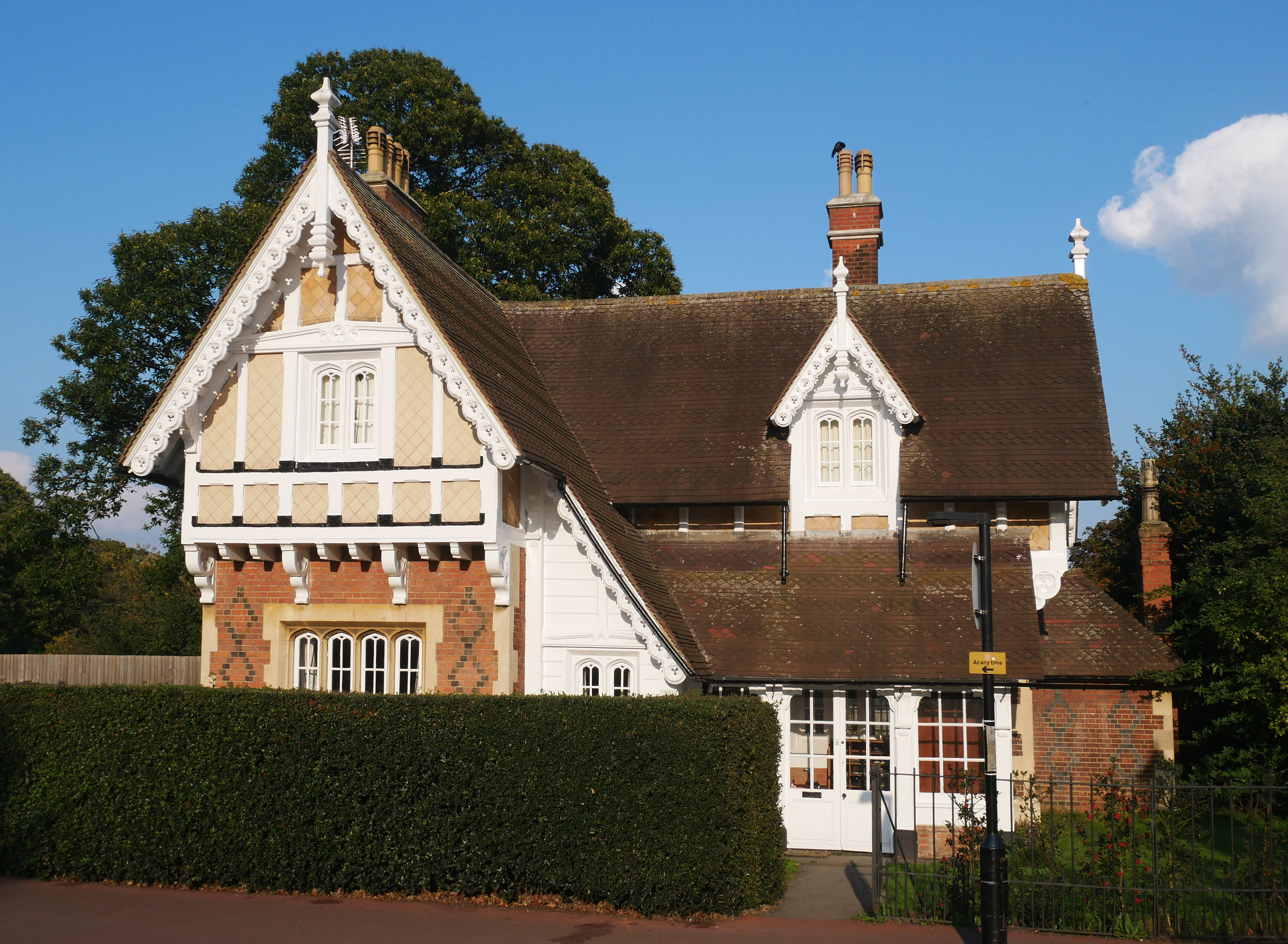
Lodge at the south entrance

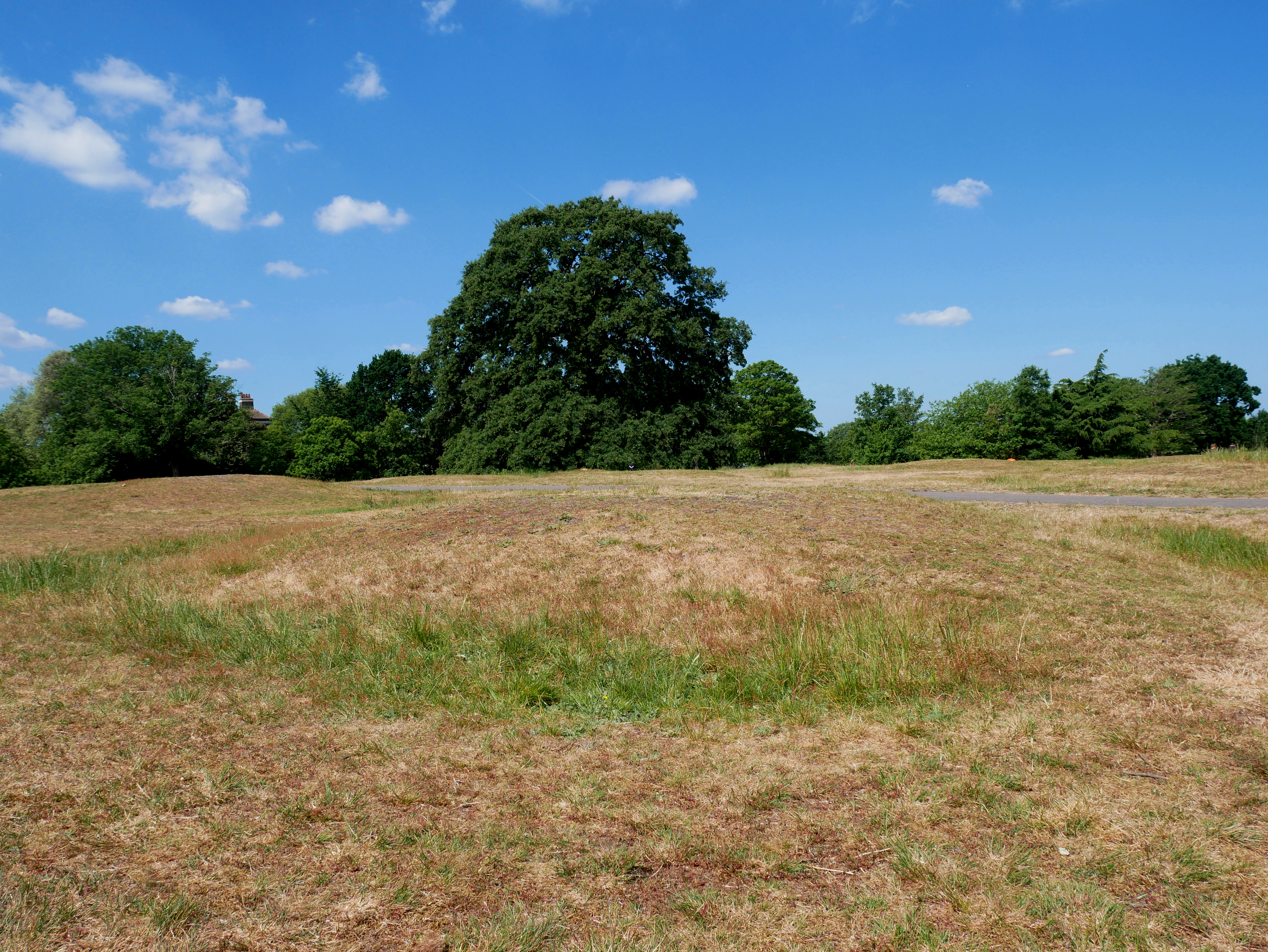
Early medieval burial mounds in Greenwich Park

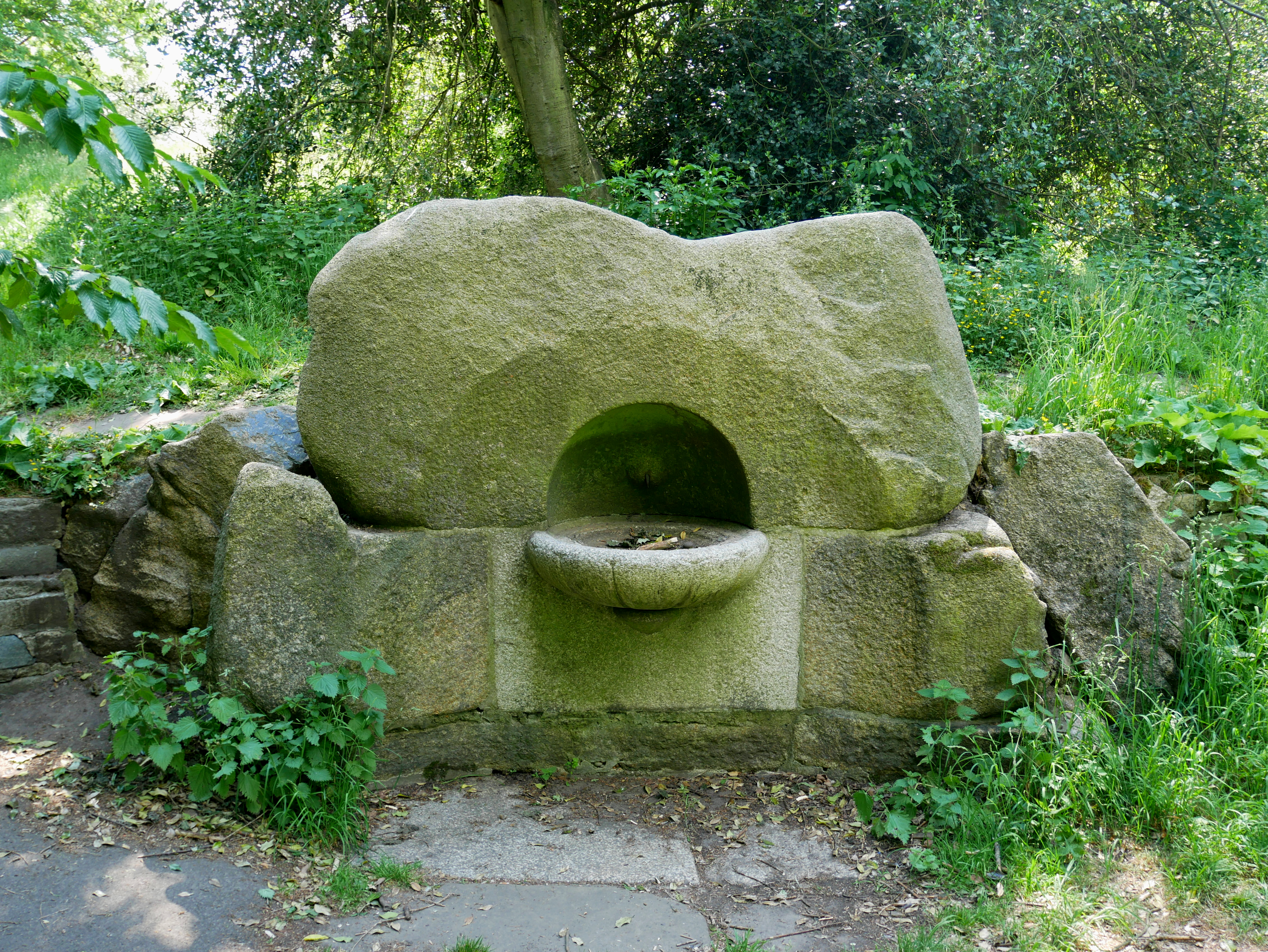
The Motherstone, a spring-fed drinking fountain in Greenwich Park

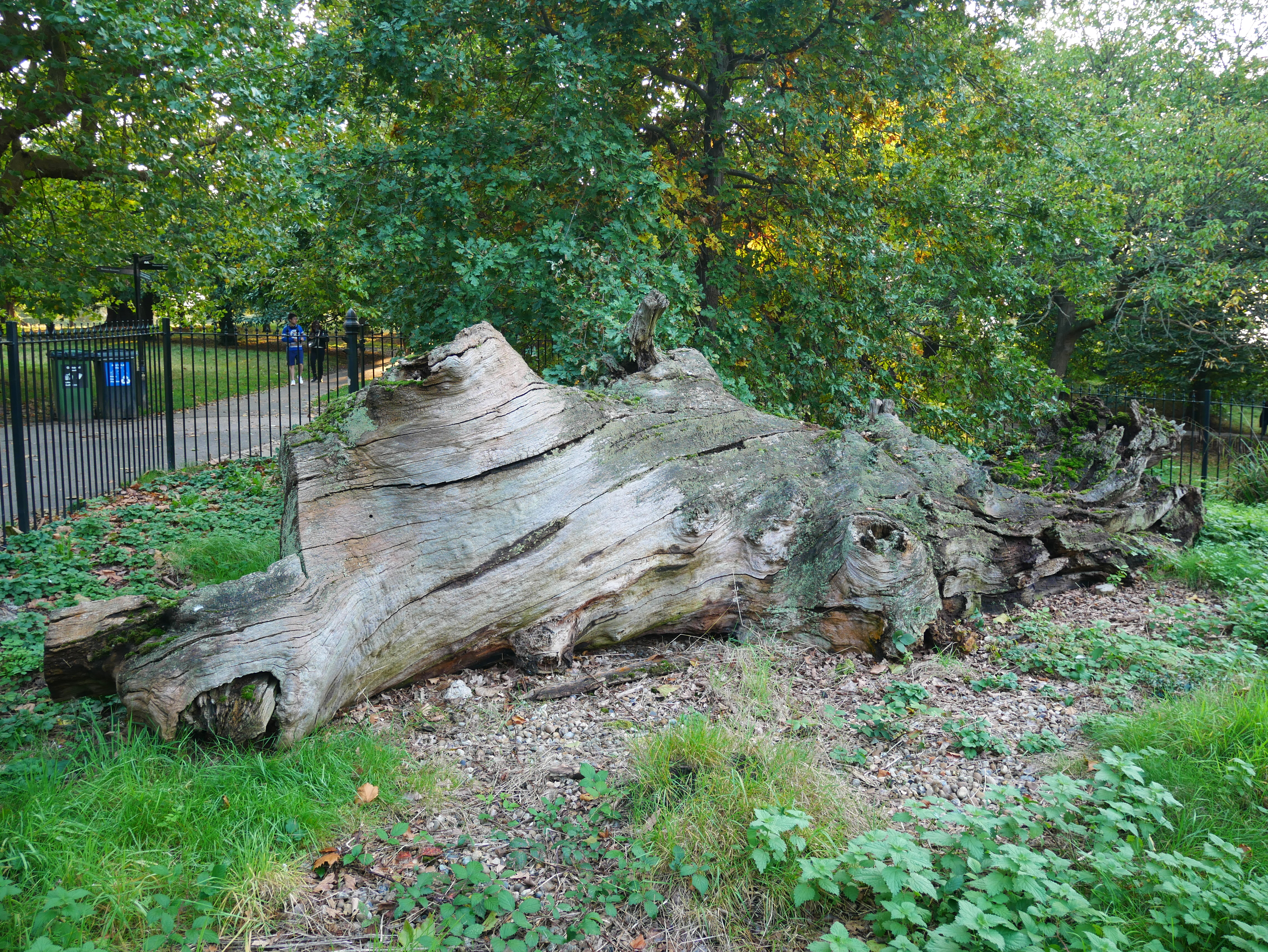
"Queen Elizabeth's Oak"

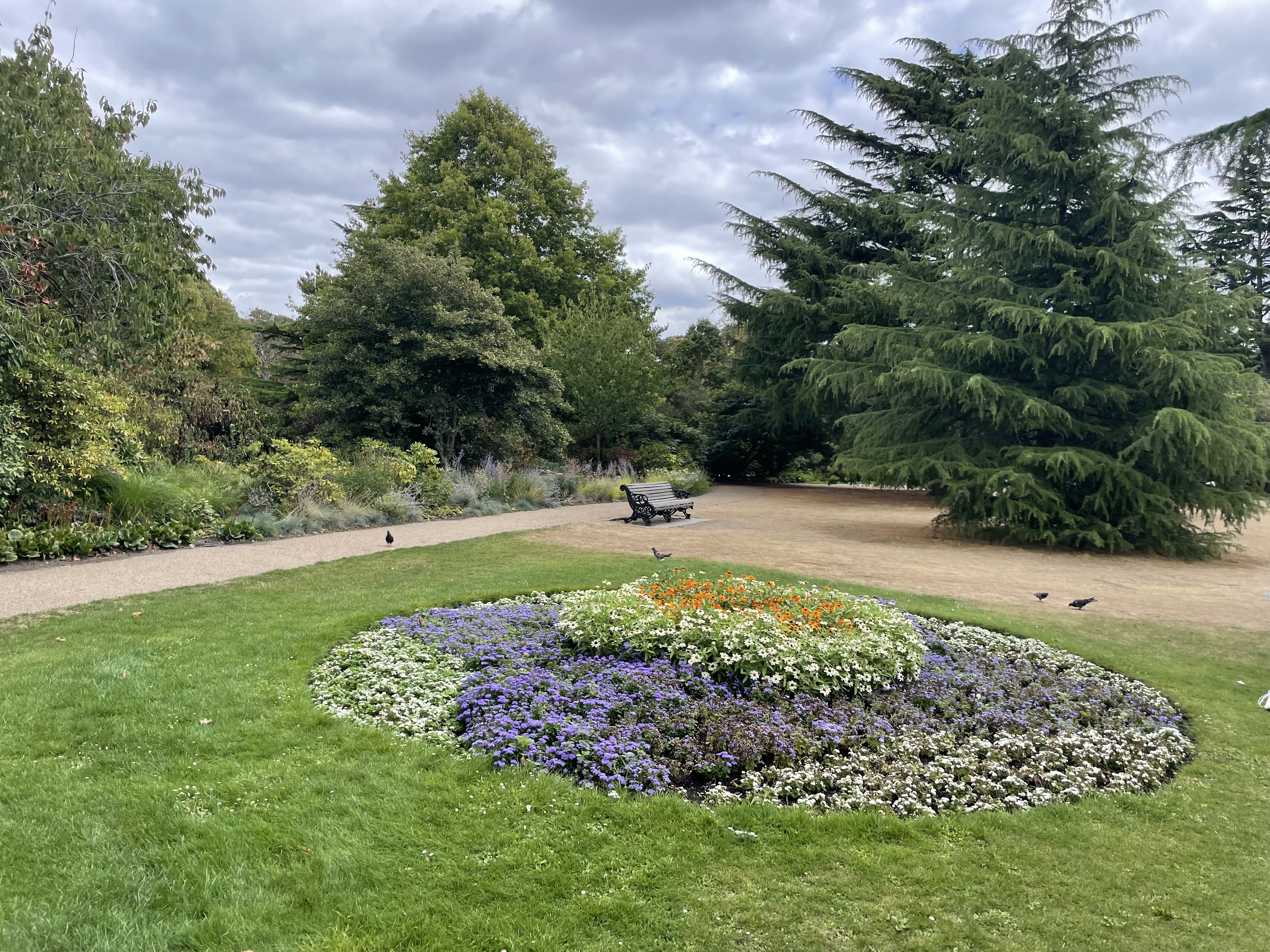
Greenwich Park Flower Garden

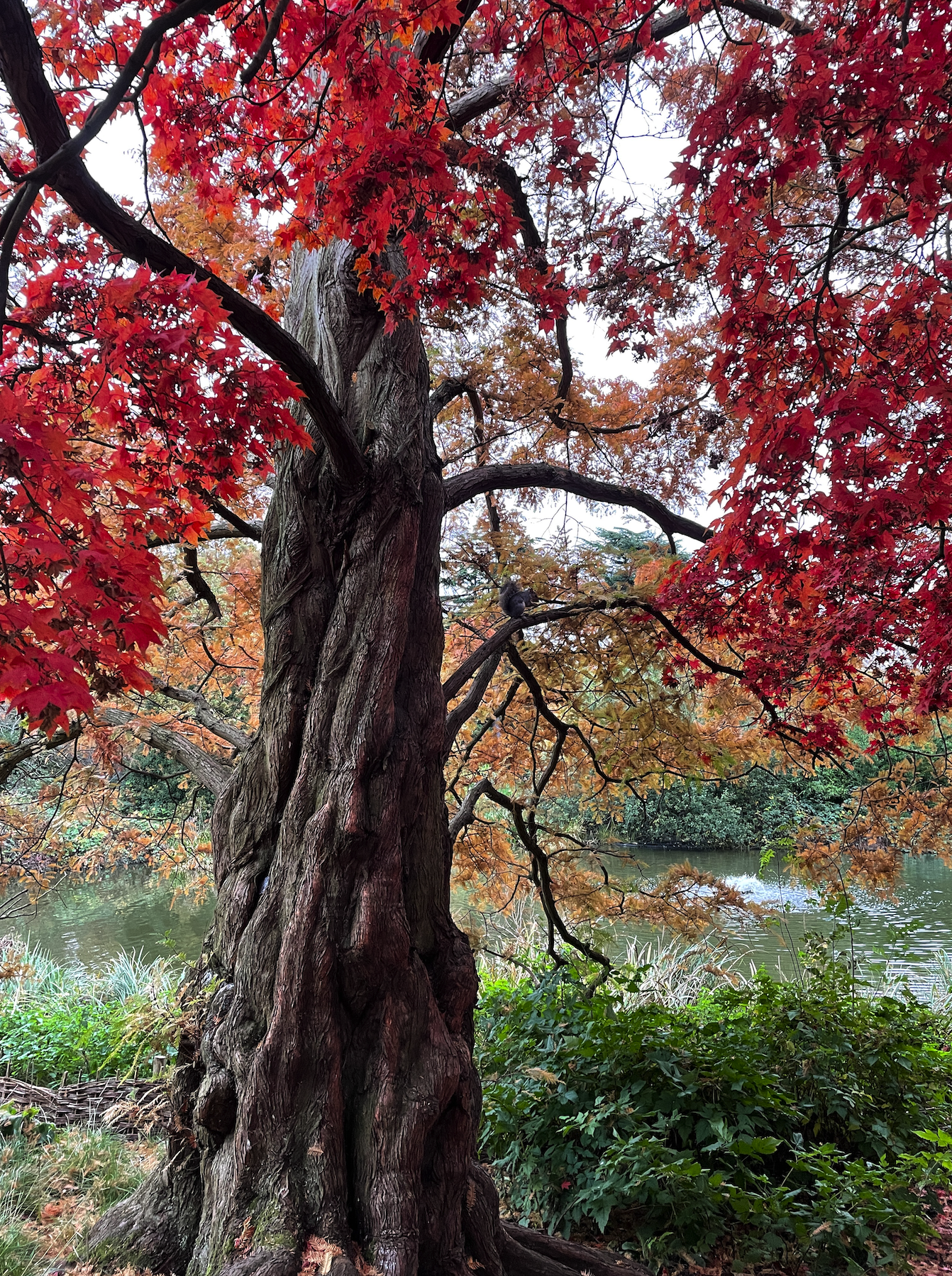
Acer Palmatum, Japanese Maple

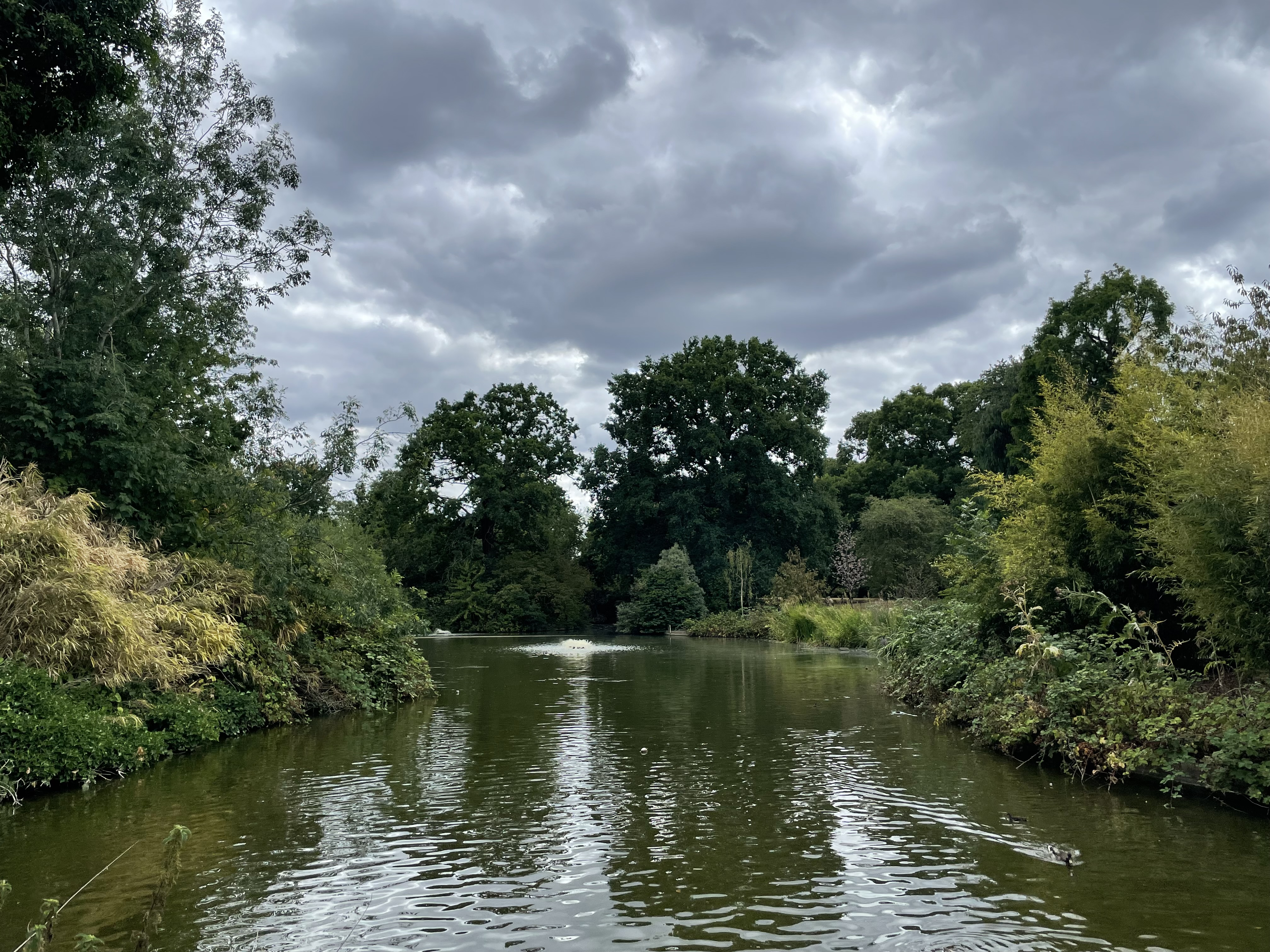
Greenwich Park Pond
