= Greenwich Castle =

Former royal hunting lodge in England

Coordinates: 51.4779°N 0.0019°W

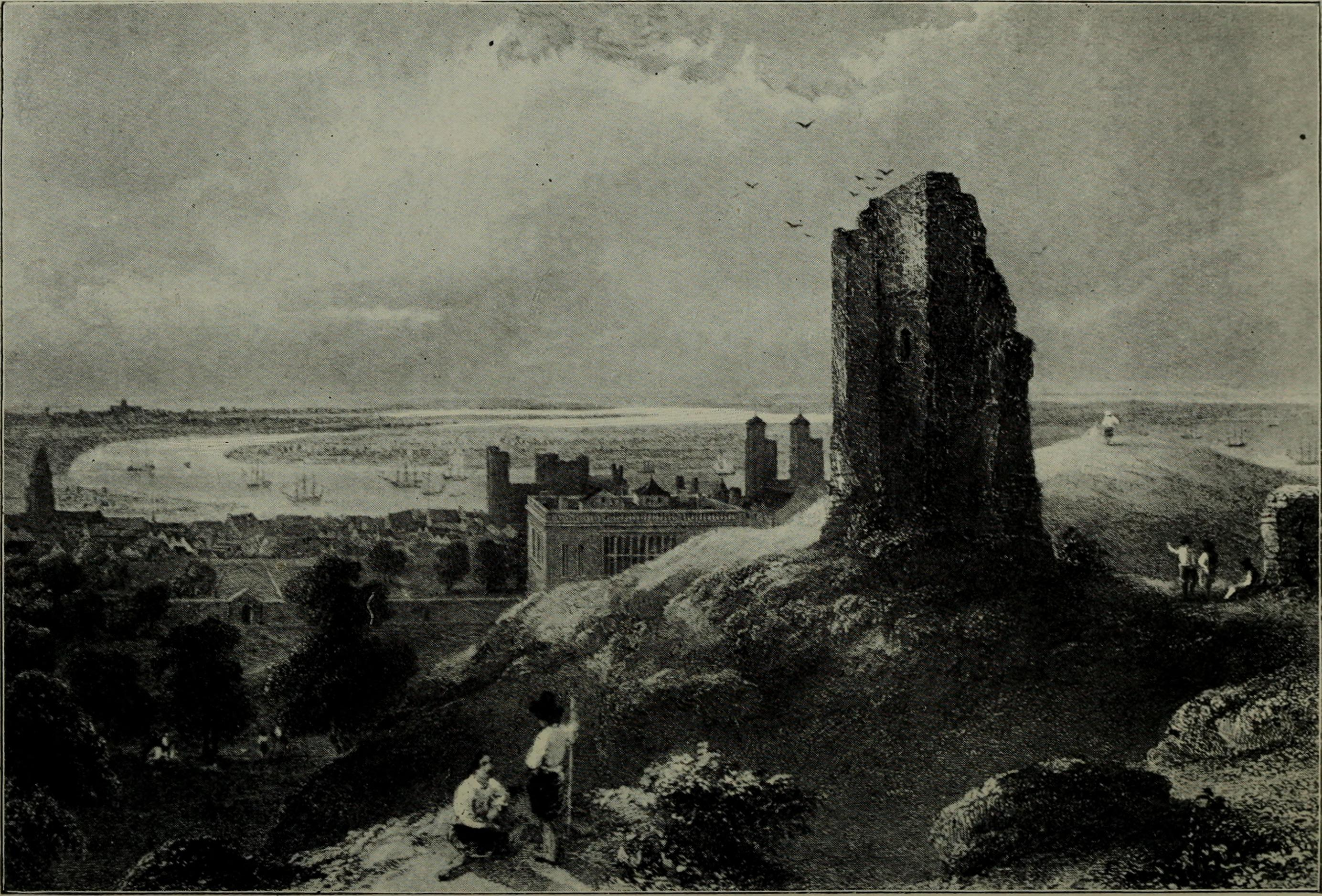
A 1902 imaginative reconstruction of the Greenwich Castle ruins, at that time long since demolished

Greenwich Castle was a hunting lodge used during the reign of Henry VIII, located in Greenwich Park, in Greenwich, England. The Royal Observatory, Greenwich now stands on the site. Greenwich Castle was apparently a favourite place for Henry VIII to house his mistresses, as it was within easy travelling distance of Greenwich Palace at the foot of the hill.

The castle was previously known as Duke Humphrey's Tower after its builder, Humphrey, Duke of Gloucester, a younger brother of King Henry V.
