= Queen Elizabeth's Oak =

Queen Elizabeth's Oak may refer to:

- Queen Elizabeth's Oak, Hatfield House, Hertfordshire
- Queen Elizabeth's Oak, Greenwich Park, London
- Queen Elizabeth Oak in Cowdray Park, West Sussex

== See also ==
- Queen's Oak near Potterspury, Northamptonshire. Traditionally regarded as the meeting place of Edward IV and his queen Elizabeth Woodville
