= Palace of Placentia =

Former English royal residence at Greenwich, Greater London

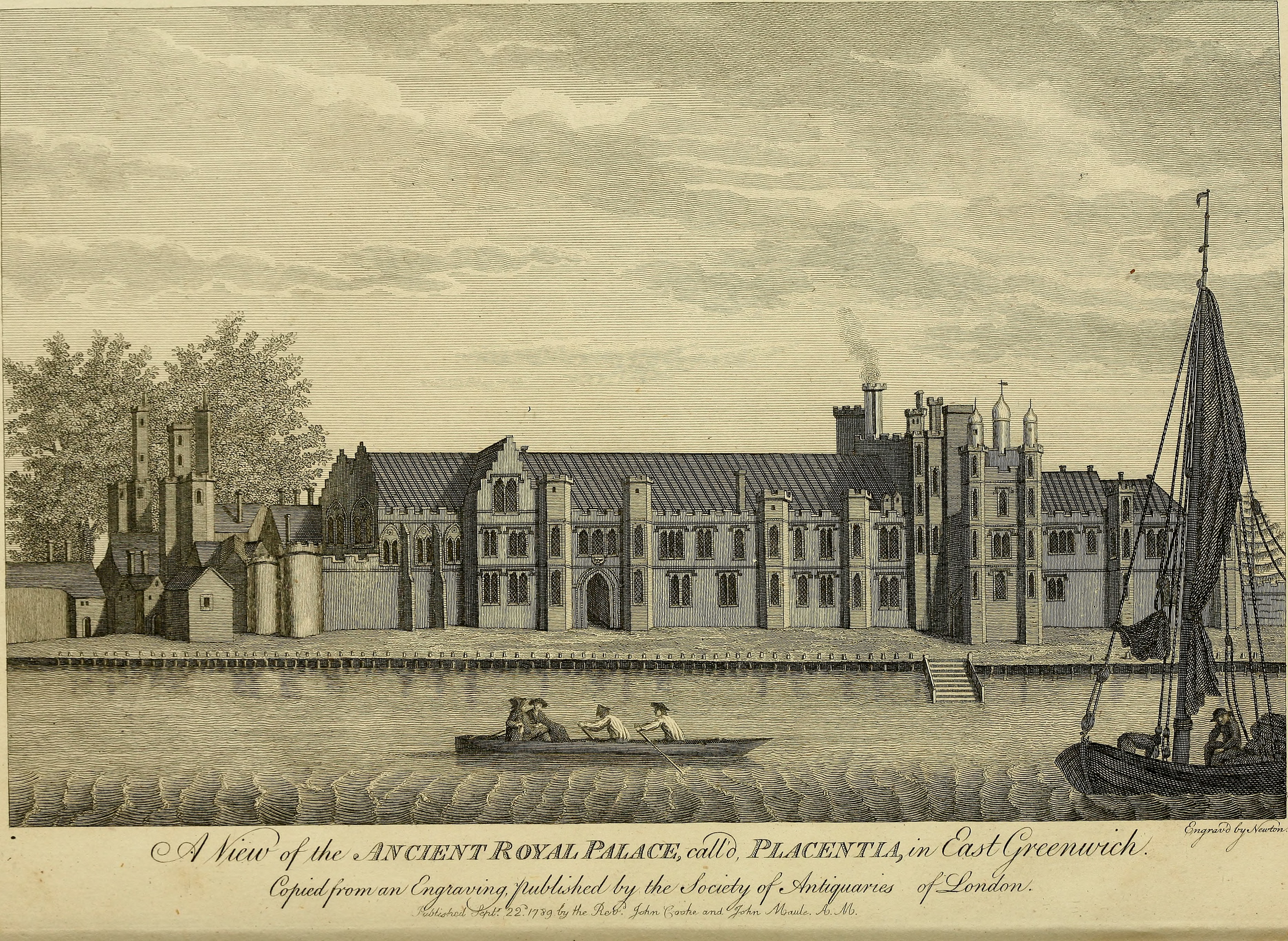
- The Palace of Placentia, after it was rebuilt around 1500 by Henry VII

- Location within Royal Borough of Greenwich
- 51°28′56″N 0°0′24″W

History
- Built: 1443
- Built for: Humphrey, Duke of Gloucester
- Rebuilt: 1498–1504; 1660

The Palace of Placentia, also known as Greenwich Palace, was an English royal residence that was initially built by Prince Humphrey, Duke of Gloucester, in 1443. Over the centuries it took several different forms, until it was turned into a hospital in the 1690s. The palace was a place designed for pleasure, entertainment and an escape from the city. It was located at Greenwich on the south bank of the River Thames, downstream from London.

On a hill behind his palace, the duke built Duke Humphrey's Tower, later known as Greenwich Castle; the "castle" was subsequently demolished to make way for the Royal Observatory, Greenwich, which survives. The original river-side residence was extensively rebuilt around 1500 by King Henry VII. A detached residence, the Queen's House, was built on the estate in the early 1600s and also survives. In 1660, the old main palace was demolished by Charles II to make way for a proposed new palace, which was only partly constructed in the east wing. Nearly forty years later, at the behest of Queen Mary II, the Greenwich Hospital (now called the Old Royal Naval College) remodelled this wing, expanded, and rebuilt on the site.

== History ==
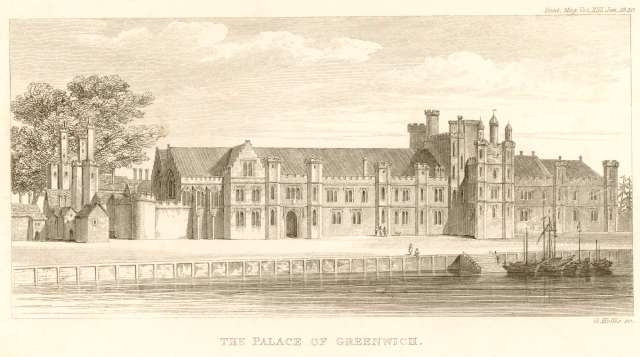
A sketch of the Tudor era Greenwich Palace, published long after it was demolished, in The Gentleman's Magazine in 1840 (earlier published by W. Bristow in 1797)

Humphrey was regent during the minority of Henry VI (his nephew) and started building the palace in 1443, under the name Bella Court. In 1447, Humphrey fell out of favour with Henry VI and was arrested for high treason. He died in prison, likely due to a stroke, though it was popularly believed that he was murdered (as is depicted in William Shakespeare's plays about Henry VI). Margaret of Anjou took over Bella Court, renaming it the Palace of Placentia, sometimes written as the 'Palace of Pleasaunce'.

Edward IV gave land and property adjacent to the palace for the foundation of a friary by the Observant Friars (a branch of the Franciscans) and in 1485 the community was formally established in a newly constructed church and cloister following papal approval. The friary church served as the chapel royal at Greenwich and was used for royal baptisms and marriages, including marriage of Henry VIII and Catherine of Aragon and the christenings of the future queens Mary I and Elizabeth I. However, the friars were persecuted during the English Reformation and finally expelled by Elizabeth I in 1559.

In the next centuries, the name "Greenwich Palace" was commonly used. Henry VII rebuilt the palace between 1498 and 1504. The master mason was Robert Vertue. The design included new plans or "platt of Greenwich which was devised by the Queen", which highlights the key contribution of Elizabeth of York for the rebuild. The King's lodgings were on the bank of the Thames, including a five-storey tower or donjon. The tower and lodgings seem to have derived from Burgundian precedents such as the (now demolished) Ducal Palace at Ghent and the Princehof at Bruges. Greenwich remained the principal royal palace for the next two centuries.

The palace was the birthplace of Henry VIII in 1491, and it figured largely in his life. Henry VIII held tournaments and pageants at Greenwich, for New Year's Day 1512, six ladies held a stage-set castle called the "Fortress Dangerous" against the king and his companions. On 1 May 1515, Henry VIII and Catherine of Aragon rode from Greenwich Palace to have breakfast in an arbour constructed in a wood at Shooter's Hill. Catherine and her ladies were dressed in Spanish-style riding gear, Henry was in green velvet. The royal guard was disguised as Robin Hood and his men, and there was a pageant and masque. The palace was the birthplace of Mary I in 1516.

After Henry VIII's marriage to Anne Boleyn, his daughter, later Elizabeth I, was born at Greenwich Palace in 1533. New wooden coops were made for the peacocks and a pelican, further from the palace, as their calls disturbed Anne Boleyn in the mornings. Henry VIII married Anne of Cleves at Greenwich in 1540. A fallen tree in Greenwich Park is known as Queen Elizabeth's Oak, in which she is reputed to have played as a child.

Both Mary and Elizabeth lived at Greenwich Palace for some years during the sixteenth century, but during the reigns of James I and Charles I, the Queen's House was erected to the south of the palace. When James I ordered the redecoration of the chapel in May 1623, it had not been refurbished since the reign of Mary I. The palace fell into disrepair during the English Civil War, serving time as a biscuit factory and a prisoner-of-war camp.

In 1660, Charles II decided to rebuild the palace, engaging John Webb as the architect for a new King's House. The only section of the new building to be completed was the east range of the present King Charles Court, but this was never occupied as a royal residence. Most of the rest of the palace was demolished, and the site remained empty until construction of the Greenwich Hospital began in 1694.

== Architecture ==
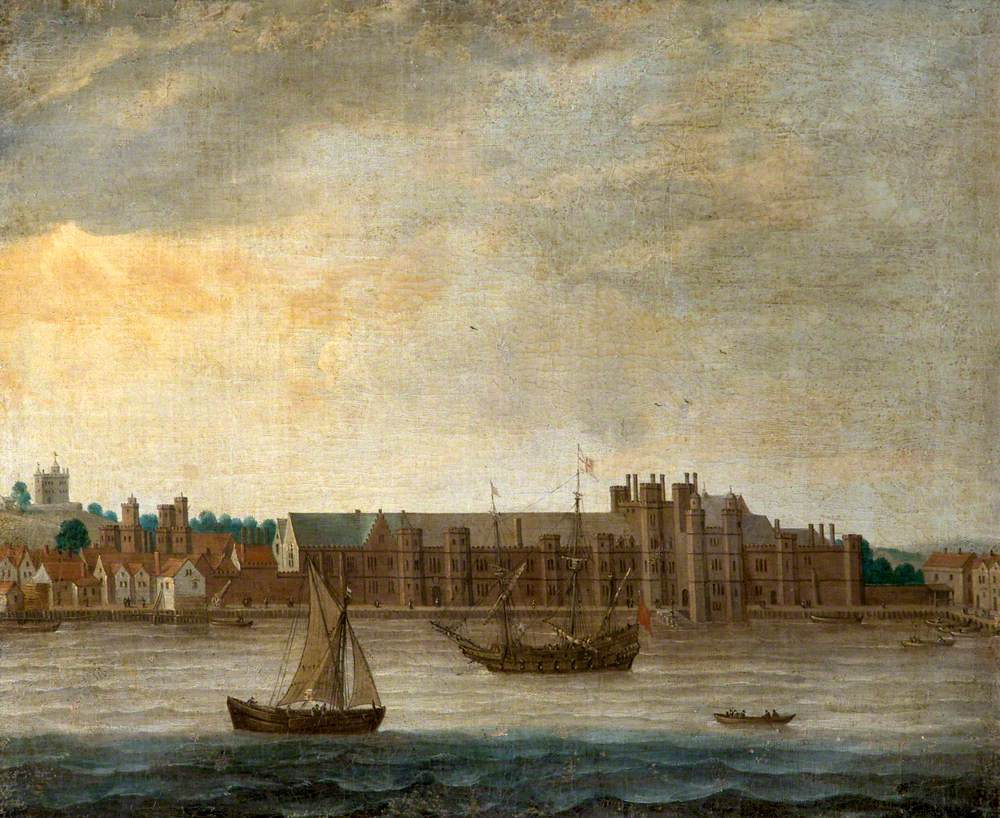
An early-17th century painting of the palace (now at Kingston Lacy).

The palace at Greenwich was built in the Tudor style. Although the structure is no longer standing, the size and design of Greenwich Palace were said to be similar to that of Hampton Court Palace in west London, which was built around the same time as Henry VII's rebuild of Placentia.

The original building was constructed primarily with brick and timber. The initial palace design had state apartments, a chapel, a five-storey viewing tower, and two octagonal towers overlooking the tiltyard. The chapel, which was rebuilt by Henry VIII, featured stained-glass windows and black-and-white glazed tiles. The main face of the building looked out over the river Thames. It extended along 200m of the bank of the river and was accessible by boat. Piles from the original Tudor-era jetty remain today. Its red-brick exterior showcased the monarchy's wealth as the material was expensive to manufacture and considered an extravagance. Aside from chapel renovations, Henry VIII also added an armoury, stables, and a banquet hall to the original palace.

During the early 17th century, as the palace was being rebuilt, Anne of Denmark commissioned several buildings including the Queen's House, three rooms along the garden, and a grotto aviary to be built in the gardens. The aviary was designed by Salomon de Caus, a French architect and engineer. It was ornately decorated with pearls and shells and was covered in moss. The only surviving building of the 17th-century additions to the palace is the Queen's House. This building, designed by architect Inigo Jones, is of particular architectural and historical significance as it is often credited as being the first classical building in England, and was a clear departure from the Tudor style.

Archeological work in 2017 gave new insight into the architecture of the old palace. One of the more notable findings was lead-glazed tiles. These tiles were probably used as the flooring for the service areas such as the kitchen.

== Modern era ==
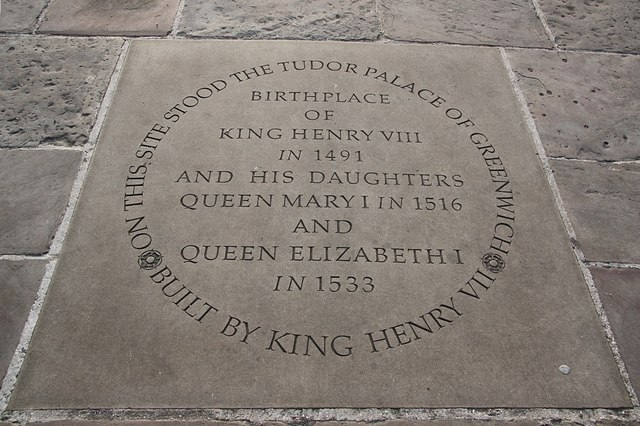
Historic marker on the site of the former palace

The Greenwich Hospital complex became the Greenwich Royal Naval College in 1873, when the naval college was moved from Portsmouth. The buildings are today occupied by the University of Greenwich and the music faculty of Trinity Laban Conservatoire of Music and Dance.

Construction work for drains in late 2005 identified previously unknown Tudor remains. A full archaeological excavation completed in January 2006 found the Tudor Chapel and Vestry with its tiled floor in situ. The vestry of the old palace was not demolished and later became the home of the treasurer of Greenwich Hospital.

During construction of the visitors' centre for the painted hall in 2017, two more Tudor palace rooms were uncovered. One room contained bee holes for keeping hives in the winter. The other was believed to be part of the service range.
