= Queen Elizabeth's Oak, Greenwich Park =

Tree in Greenwich Park, London, England

Queen Elizabeth's Oak
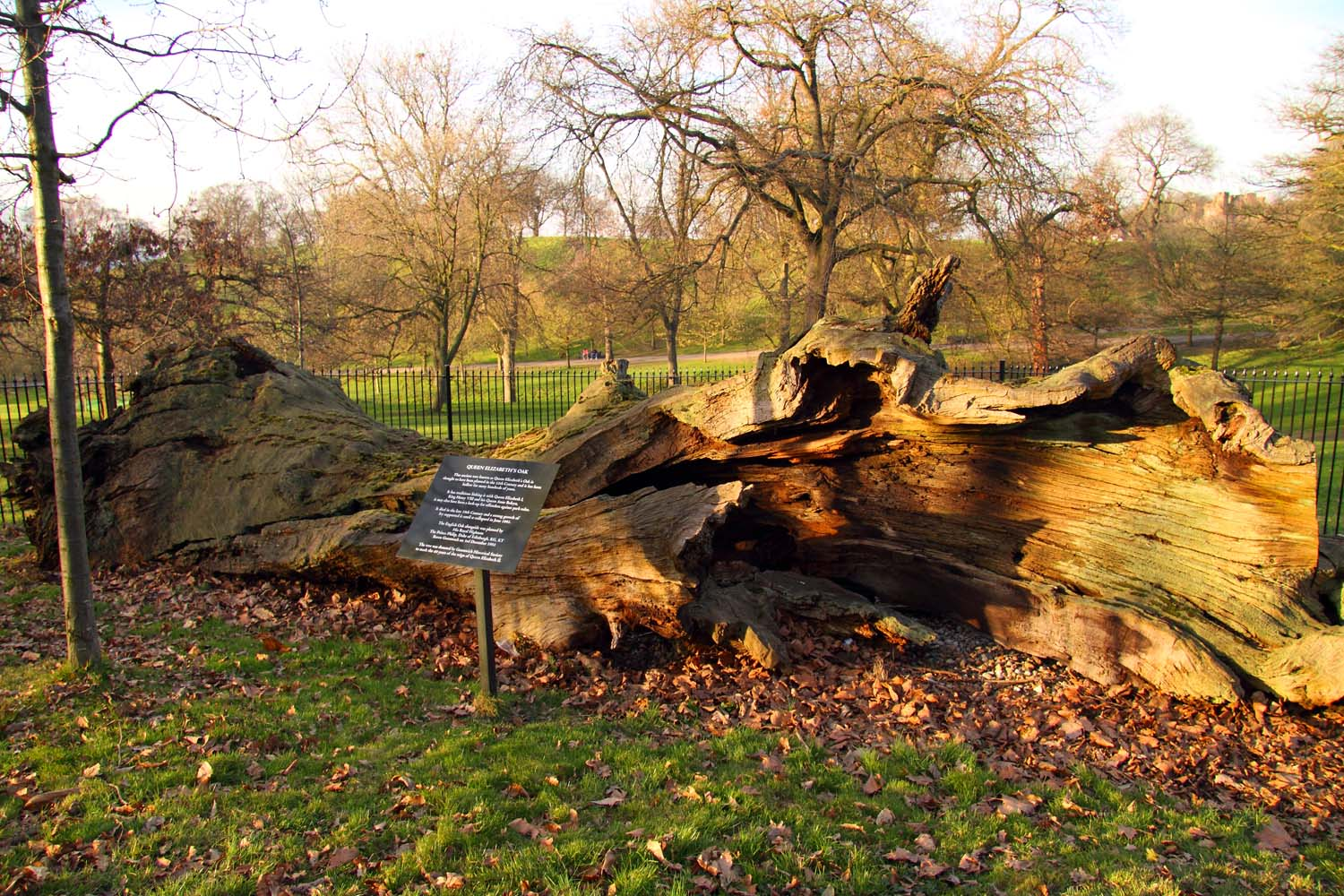
- The fallen tree photographed in 2011
- Species: Oak (Quercus)
- Location: Greenwich Park, London
- Coordinates: 51.478104°N 0.001764°E
- Date seeded: 12th century
- Date felled: 1991 (storm)

Queen Elizabeth's Oak was a veteran oak tree in Greenwich Park, London. Seeded in the 12th century, the tree formed part of the grounds of the Palace of Placentia, home to the Tudor royal family. Henry VIII is said to have danced around the tree with Anne Boleyn. Their daughter Elizabeth I, after whom the tree is named, is said to have picnicked beneath its canopy, or else within its hollow trunk. When the palace grounds became Greenwich Park, the hollow tree was used as a prison for criminals caught on the grounds. The tree died in the 19th century but was left standing, partly supported by ivy. It fell in a storm in June 1991 and has been left lying where it fell, protected by a fence and marked with a plaque.

== Royal connection ==
The oak is thought to date from the 12th century and was incorporated into the grounds of the Tudor Palace of Placentia. The palace was the birthplace of Henry VIII (1491) as well as his daughters Mary (1516) and Elizabeth (1533). The palace was one of Henry's favourite places; he spent much time in its grounds and is said to have danced around the tree with Anne Boleyn, Elizabeth's mother. Elizabeth spent some of her childhood at the palace and is said to have picnicked under the tree, or by some accounts, within its hollow trunk.

== Prison ==
The palace was later abandoned by the royal family and it became the site of the Greenwich Naval Hospital and the Royal Naval College; part of the grounds became Greenwich Park. A park keeper's lodge was erected near to the tree in the 17th century and was demolished in 1853. The tree's hollow trunk was used as a prison for criminals caught within the park, who were secured behind a heavy wooden door which covered the 6-foot-diameter (1.8 m) hole in the trunk.

== Death and commemoration ==
Queen Elizabeth's Oak had died by the 1870s. The tree was left standing as dead wood, partly supported by a large growth of ivy. The tree was a 20-foot (6.1 m) stump by 1979 and fell during a storm in June 1991. The dead tree was left lying on the ground. A replacement oak tree, donated by the Greenwich Historical Society, was planted by Prince Philip, Duke of Edinburgh, on 3 December 1992 to mark the Ruby Jubilee of Elizabeth II. The site is marked by a plaque and both the fallen tree and its replacement are protected from damage by a metal railing fence.

== See also ==
- Queen Elizabeth's Oak
