= John Dicks (rugby union) =

England international rugby union player

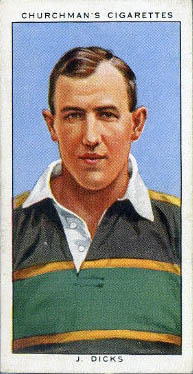
- Born: 12 September 1912 Mears Ashby, England
- Died: 7 May 1981 (aged 68) Northampton, England

Rugby union career
- Position: Forward
International career
Years	Team	Apps	(Points)
1934–37	England	8	(0)

John Dicks (12 September 1912 – 7 May 1981) was an English international rugby union player.

Born in Mears Ashby, Northamptonshire, Dicks was a forward with Northampton, making his first team debut in the 1922–23 season. He was member of the East Midlands side which won the County Championship for the first time in 1934.

Dicks was capped eight times for England during the 1930s. He played as a second rower in all of England's 1934 and 1935 Home Nations fixtures, then for his solitary appearance in 1936 was moved to the front row alongside Northampton teammate Ray Longland, before playing in the back row for his final match in 1937.

== See also ==
- List of England national rugby union players
