= Arthur Butler (rugby union) =

English rugby union player

- Full name: Arthur Geoffrey Butler
- Born: 30 September 1914 Oxford, England
- Died: 21 March 2007 (aged 92) Henley-on-Thames, England

Rugby union career
- Position: Wing
International career
Years	Team	Apps	(Points)
1937	England	2	(3)

Arthur Geoffrey Butler (30 September 1914 – 21 March 2007) was an English international rugby union player.

Born in Oxford, Butler was a speedy wing three-quarter, who won Southern Counties championships in the 100 and 220 yards sprint events. He played his rugby for Harlequins and was capped twice for England during their triple crown-winning 1937 Home Nations campaign. After debuting against Wales at Twickenham, Butler contributed a second-half try in the 9–8 win over Ireland, but wasn't picked for the final fixture against Scotland.

Butler was appointed RFU president in 1963, becoming the first from the Oxfordshire union to fill the position.

== See also ==
- List of England national rugby union players
