= Potterspury =

Village in Northamptonshire, England

Coordinates: 52.0858°N 0.8977°W

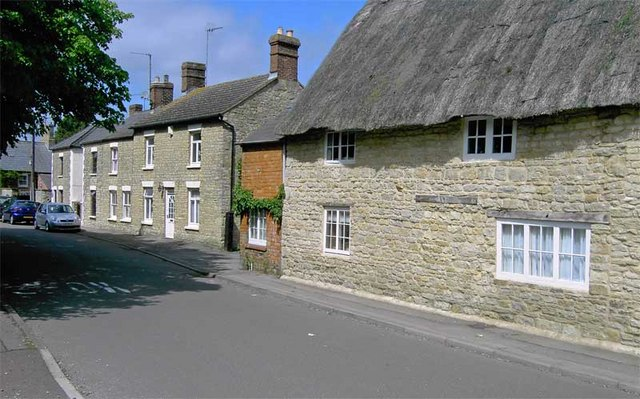
- Narrow private access to the High Street, Potterspury from the A5

- Location within Northamptonshire
- Interactive map of Potterspury
- Population: 1,453
- OS grid reference: SP7543
  - London: 61 miles (98 km)
- Unitary authority: West Northamptonshire
- Ceremonial county: Northamptonshire
- Region: East Midlands
- Country: England
- Sovereign state: United Kingdom
- Post town: Towcester
- Postcode district: NN12
- Dialling code: 01908
- Police: Northamptonshire
- Fire: Northamptonshire
- Ambulance: East Midlands
- UK Parliament: South Northamptonshire

Potterspury is a village and civil parish in West Northamptonshire, England. The nearest major settlement is Milton Keynes, the centre of which is about 7 miles south-east. At the time of the 2011 census, the parish's population (including Furtho) was 1,453 people.

The village's name is a concatenation. It was originally cognate with Perry and sometimes written as such, implying pear tree or orchard. Several places are named such regionally. The helpful (disambiguatory) prefix 'Potters', seen by the 15th century, is a nod to the very old, important potteries here. (Note: Britain's most populous place prefixed Potters is Potters Bar, 40 miles away; Paulerspury is less than 2.) An alternative is "Estpury", seen in 1452.

== Geography ==
Potterspury is on the A5 road, formerly the Roman road of Watling Street between Towcester six miles to the north and Stony Stratford a mile to the south. The village sits at the edge of Whittlewood Forest, a relatively large ancient woodland to the west that was part of the original estate of the Duke of Grafton. Much of this is an SSSI, recognising its biodiversity and providing strong protection against built environment encroachment. Parts are open to the public in the Spring but most footpaths and bridleways adjoin the area, some linking into the Chiltern Hills (Chilterns).

Stony Stratford and Towcester have nearby substantial shopping areas.

Nearby villages comprise Wicken, Deanshanger, Grafton Regis, Alderton and Yardley Gobion.

== Landmarks ==
The parish church, with medieval elements, is dedicated to Saint Nicholas. Its foundations date to at least 1087 when it (implying its rectory, its main church lands) was granted by Robert de Ferrers, 1st Earl of Derby to Bernard the Scribe. The Queen's Oak which stood nearby until 1997 was reputed to be the site of the first meeting between Edward IV and his queen Elizabeth Woodville.

Wakefield Lodge is a Grade II* listed house to the north of the village, built around 1750 as a hunting lodge for Charles FitzRoy, 2nd Duke of Grafton.

== Facilities ==
The high street has is a small grocery/stationery shop with post office and a village hall.

The village pubs The Talbot on the A5 and The Cock on the High Street. There is a sports and social club at Meadow View, the ground of Potterspury Football Club.

== Education ==
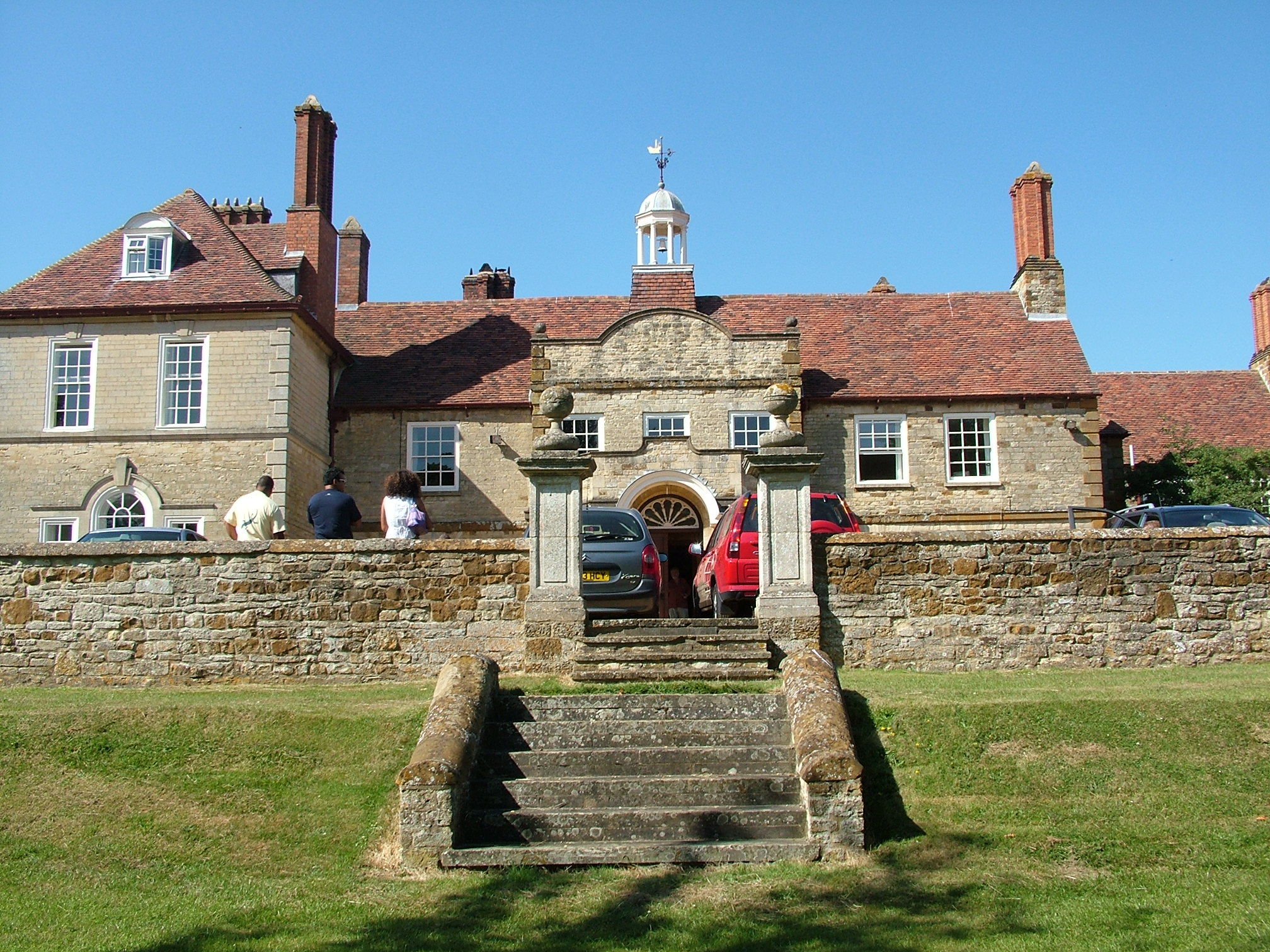
Potterspury Lodge school frontage

Educational provision in the village includes primary education at John Hellins Primary School, with Potterspury Lodge School, providing provision for children with special educaitonal needs. John Hellins was a mathematician and astronomer who, as parish priest at Potterspury, founded and taught in the village school in 1817.
