= Gordon Cridlan =

England international rugby union player

Arthur Cridlan
- Full name: Arthur Gordon Cridlan
- Born: 9 July 1909 Ealing, England
- Died: 17 January 1993 (aged 83) Exeter, England
- School: Uppingham School
- University: University of Oxford
- Occupation: Hotel manager

Rugby union career
- Position: Wing-forward
International career
Years	Team	Apps	(Points)
1935	England	3	(0)

Arthur Gordon Cridlan (9 July 1909 – 17 January 1993) was an English international rugby union player.

Cridlan was born in Ealing and attended Uppingham School, where he captained the rugby team in 1926–27.

A three-time Oxford blue, Cridlan spent the remainder of his rugby career with Blackheath and in 1935 played wing-forward for England in three Home Nations matches, debuting against Wales at Twickenham.

Cridlan was director of the Regent Hotel in Leamington Spa.

== See also ==
- List of England national rugby union players
