= Victor Lyttle =

Rugby union player from Northern Ireland

- Full name: Victor Johnstone Lyttle
- Born: 17 July 1911 Belfast, Ireland
- Died: 7 September 1996 (aged 85) Birmingham, England
- School: Methodist College

Rugby union career
- Position: Wing
International career
| Years | Team | Apps | (Points) |
| 1938–39 | Ireland | 3 | (0) |

Victor Johnstone Lyttle (17 July 1911 — 7 September 1996) was an Irish international rugby union player.

Born in Belfast, Lyttle was the son of photographer R. Clements Lyttle, a noted association football administrator. He attended Methodist College Belfast and subsequently competed for Collegians, before moving to London.

Lyttle, a wing three-quarter, played in London for Harlequins, then took up a job with Kodak in Birmingham and transferred to Bedford. He was an East Midlands representative player and toured Wales with the Barbarians in 1938. Capped three times for Ireland, Lyttle debuted against England in a 1938 Home Nations at Lansdowne Road and made a further two appearances during their 1939 Home Nations campaign.

== See also ==
- List of Ireland national rugby union players
