= Ray Longland =

England international rugby union player

- Full name: Raymond John Longland
- Born: 29 December 1908 Lavendon, England
- Died: 21 September 1975 (aged 66)
- Occupation(s): RAF PTI, Carpenter

Rugby union career
- Position: Prop
Senior career
Years	Team	Apps	(Points)
19??-19??	Olney		
19??-1926	Bedford		
1926-1948	Northampton Saints	356	(145)
- Correct as of 2 March 2024
International career
Years	Team	Apps	(Points)
1931-1937	East Midlands		
1932-1938	England	19	(0)
1943	RAF		
- Correct as of 2 March 2024

Raymond John Longland (born 29 December 1908) was a former English rugby union player, who played as a Prop for Olney, Bedford and Northampton Saints.

== Career ==
=== Club ===
Longland began his career at Olney RFC before moving to Bedford RUFC.

He joined Northampton Saints in 1926, making his debut in a clash against Nottingham on the December 3rd, 1926. He spent two seasons as captain, 1936 and 1947. He scored 14 penalties 26 conversions and 17 tries in 356 appearances.

=== County ===
He played for the East Midlands county side featuring in a 21–30 loss against the Springboks. As well as playing in the East Midlands successful 1933-34 County Championship campaign.

=== International ===
He made his international debut in the 1932 Home Nations Championship, helping win the Calcutta Cup in the final match of the championship. He was part of the England side that beat New Zealand in 1936. In total, he won 19 caps.

== Personal life ==
He was born December 29, 1908, Lavendon. By trade he was a carpenter but when he joined the Air Force he served as a Physical Training Instructor reaching the rank of Corporal. In 1975 he died of leukaemia.
