= Bill Weston (rugby union) =

British Lions & England international rugby union player (1904–1987)

- Full name: William Henry Weston
- Born: 21 December 1904 Potterspury, England
- Died: 5 January 1987 (aged 82) Towcester, England
- School: Oakham School
- Occupation: Farmer

Rugby union career
- Position: Wing-forward
Senior career
Years	Team	Apps	(Points)
1923–38	Northampton	390	
International career
Years	Team	Apps	(Points)
1933–38	England	16	(0)
1936	British Lions		

William Henry Weston (21 December 1904 – 5 January 1987) was an English international rugby union player.

== Biography ==
Born in Potterspury, Northamptonshire, Weston was the son of farmer Harry Weston, an ex-England forward. He attended Oakham School and at age 18 made his debut for Northampton, where he spent his entire career.

Weston was capped 16 times for England during the 1930s as a blind-side wing-forward, which included the 1934 and 1937 Home Nations triple crowns, as well as a historic maiden win over the All Blacks on home soil in 1936. He toured Argentina with the 1936 British Lions and appeared in all but one of the fixtures.

== See also ==
- List of England national rugby union players
- List of British & Irish Lions players
