= Potterspury Lodge School =

Special school in Northamptonshire, England

Cambian Potterspury Lodge School

Location
- Towcester; England; 52.0962°N 0.9118°W

Information
- Type: Other Independent Special School
- Established: 1956
- Specialist: Cambian Group
- Department for Education URN: 122136 Tables
- Ofsted: Reports
- Principal: Jenny Nimmo
- Head of Education: Rhett Cameron
- Registered Manager of Children's Home: Chris Pearce
- Age: 8 to 18
- Enrolment: Pupil Admission Number (PAN) is 64, mixed gender admission
- Houses: 4 boarding houses
- Colour
- Website: www.cambiangroup.com/specialist-education/our-schools/autism-schools/potterspury-lodge-school/

Potterspury Lodge School is a Cambian Group school in Northamptonshire, England. It is a co-educational Independent School for 8-18 year olds that caters to children with autism spectrum disorder (ASD) alongside behavioural, SEMH, or barriers to learning. In 2024 the school achieved a "Good" rating from Ofsted. In August 2020 students achieved the best-ever grades in the school's 64-year history. The grades achieved far exceeded the national averages for special schools, with 25% of all passes in English and Maths achieved at Grades 9-5 against the national average for special schools of just 1% (DfE 2018/19 data).

In January 2021 Ofsted awarded the residential provision Children's Home status; this has allowed the school to expand the capacity for the provision to admit 38 and 52-week students.

== Location ==
Potterspury Lodge School is set in the countryside near where Northamptonshire borders Buckinghamshire. It is located on the A5 road between Towcester and Milton Keynes, and is roughly five miles away from Silverstone (where the British Grand Prix is held).

== Sports ==
The school's grounds contain a sports field, an adventure playground, a fishing lake, a sports hall, a tennis court, a basketball court, and a skate park.

== Curriculum ==
As an independent school, Potterspury Lodge sets its own curriculum which is constructed around students' needs and starting points. Students follow a broad and balanced curriculum with a core offer of English, Maths, and Science together with options such as Art, Food Technology, Geography, History, Media, Music, Physical Education, and Project Qualification. Students generally follow GCSE pathways at KS4 although some will engage with an Entry Level offer. At Sixth Form students follow a pathway to adulthood model with some engaging in college courses alongside their studies at the school to fully prepare for a successful transition post-18.

== Special needs ==
Previously the school was mostly used for children who had problems behaving or being in a classroom situation but recently the profile of students is ASD hence students who are on the autism spectrum. The school employs a clinical psychologist, mental health nurse, highly specialised speech and language therapist, and occupational health practitioner. The school also benefits from a visiting consultant child and adolescent psychiatrist.

== Acquirement by Cambian ==
In July 2015, Cambian Group bought the school. Cambian was then bought by US firm Caretech in 2018.

== Gallery ==
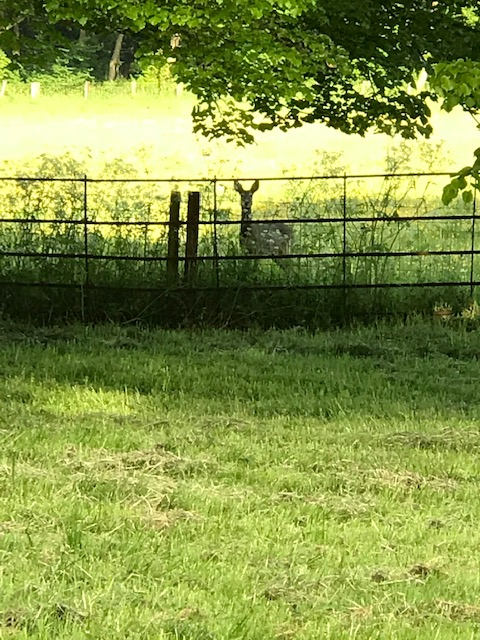
Deer roaming in the school grounds

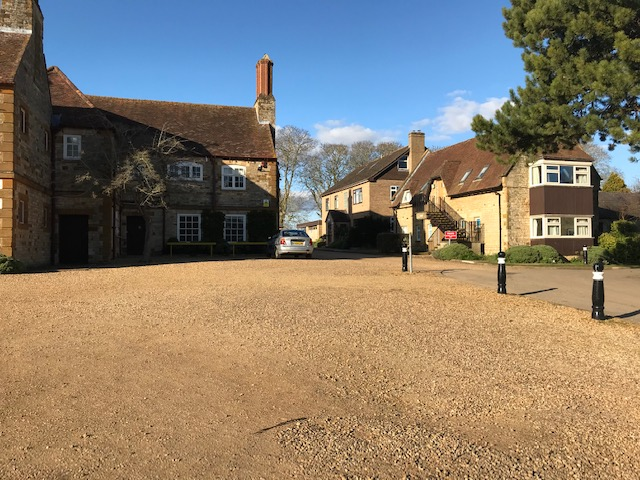
Boarding Houses

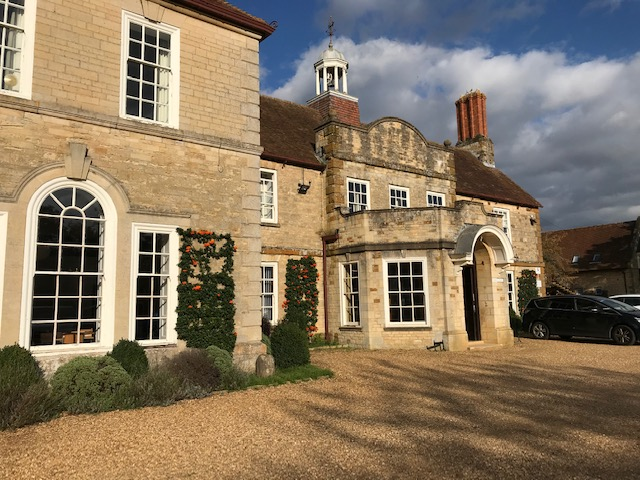
Front of Potterspury Lodge School

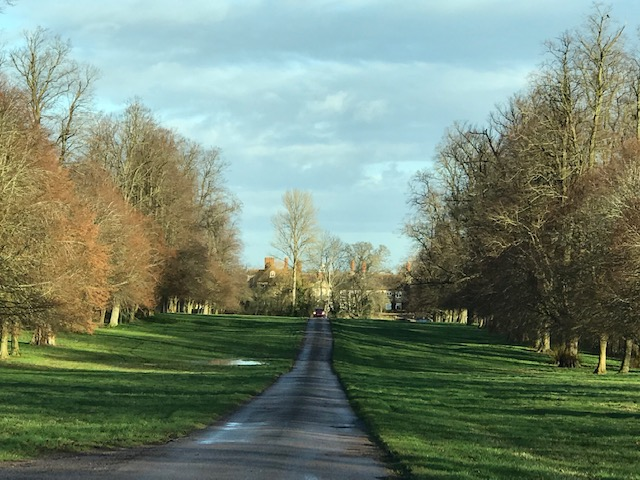
Road leading up to the school from the A5
