= Flora Sadler =

Scottish mathematician and astronomer

Flora Munro Sadler
- Born: Flora Munro McBain; 4 June 1912; Aberdeen, Scotland
- Died: 25 December 2000 (aged 88); Aberdeen, Scotland
- Education: University of Aberdeen
- Spouse: Donald Sadler
- Scientific career
- Fields: Mathematics, Astronomy, Computer Science
- Academic advisors: John Carroll (astronomer)

Flora Munro Sadler (née McBain; 4 June 1912 – 25 December 2000) was a Scottish mathematician and astronomer. She was the first woman to hold a senior position in the Royal Greenwich Observatory and the first editor of the Monthly Notices of the Royal Astronomical Society.

== Academic career ==
Flora graduated with honours in physics and astronomy from the University of Aberdeen in 1934. From 1934 to 1937 she held posts as demonstrator, lecturer in applied mathematics, and researcher into radium sources for cancer treatment. In 1936 she took part in an exhibition to Siberia with her professor J. A. Carroll to view a total solar eclipse.

In order to prepare for the expedition she spent the summer of 1935 studying at the Nautical Almanac Office (NAO), and in 1937 became the first woman scientist appointed to a senior post at the Royal Greenwich Observatory, of which the NAO was part. After the Second World War she was promoted to Principal Scientific Officer.

Flora specialised in computation of astronomical and navigational tables, specifically the motion of the moon and predicting the eclipses of stars. She collaborated internationally and her work had significance in determining the variation in the rotation of the Earth and the establishment of time.

== Royal Astronomical Society ==
Flora took on the duties of editor of the Royal Astronomical Society's professional journal, Monthly Notices of the Royal Astronomical Society in February 1948, and due to this experience was the first female to be appointed to the position of Secretary of the Royal Astronomical Society from 1949 to 1954.
