= Arthur Matthew Weld Downing =

Anglo-Irish mathematician and astronomer (1850–1917)

Arthur Matthew Weld Downing FRAS
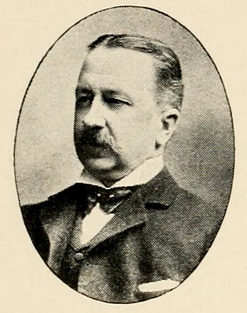
- Born: 13 April 1850; Carlow, County Carlow, United Kingdom of Great Britain and Ireland
- Died: 8 December 1917 (aged 67); Bloomsbury, London, England
- Education: Trinity College Dublin
- Spouse: Ellen Jane Downing
- Scientific career
- Fields: Mathematics, astronomy
- Workplaces: Royal Greenwich Observatory, HM Nautical Almanac Office

Arthur Matthew Weld Downing FRAS (13 April 1850 – 8 December 1917) was an Anglo-Irish mathematician and astronomer. Downing's major contribution to astronomy is in the calculation of the positions and movements of astronomical bodies, as well as being a founder of the British Astronomical Association.

== Early life and education ==
Downing was born in County Carlow on 13 April 1850, the younger son of Arthur Matthew Downing and Mary Weld. He attended Nutgrove School, near Rathfarnham, Dublin under the tuition Philip Jones. He then went on to study in Trinity College Dublin, from 1866, receiving a scholarship in science graduating with a BA in 1871 with a gold medal in mathematics. Downing went on to receive a Masters in 1881, and an honorary Doctor of Science in 1893.

== Career ==
He became an assistant at the Royal Greenwich Observatory on 17 January 1873. He was first in charge of the manuscripts and library, followed by the time department, and then the circle computations. One of his areas of study was that of the altazimuth or horizontal coordinate system, as well as bring one of the four observers of the transit circle and altazimuth. In 1875, Downing was elected as a fellow of the Royal Astronomical Society, contributing 75 papers dealing primarily with correcting errors in the star catalogues and the computation of the motions of astronomical bodies. In one paper, he worked with George Johnstone Stoney on the perturbations of the Leonid meteors, predicting and explaining the sparseness of the 1899 shower.

He became superintendent of HM Nautical Almanac Office from 1891 until his retirement in 1910. He was elected a Fellow of the Royal Society in June 1896. He collaborated with his American counterpart Simon Newcomb in establishing an international standard for astronomical constants.

Downing was one of the founders of the British Astronomical Association, and was an ardent supporter during its early years. Through this work he gave significant support to amateur astronomy, serving as vice president (1890–1891) and later president (1892–1894) of the Association. He served as secretary (1889–1892) and vice president (1893–1895) of the Royal Astronomical Society.

Downing was married to Ellen Jane Downing, with whom he had one daughter. Downing died suddenly from heart disease on 8 December 1917, in his home at 30 New Oxford Street, Bloomsbury. He was cremated at Golders Green Crematorium on 13 December 1917.
