= John Carroll (astronomer) =

British astronomer and physicist

Carroll in 1964.

Sir John Anthony Carroll KBE FRSE FRAS (8 January 1899 – 2 May 1974) was a British astronomer and physicist. In the 1920s he worked at the Solar Physics Observatory, Cambridge, UK with F.J.M. Stratton and Richard van der Riet Woolley. He made major technological advances, inventing a high resolution spectrometer, and (with C G Fraser) a coronal camera.

== Life ==
He was born near Manchester and educated at King's School in Chester, before winning a scholarship to study at Sidney Sussex College, Cambridge, in 1916.

However, he decided to postpone Cambridge, and instead enlisted for service in the First World War, finding an interesting role in the Royal Aircraft Establishment in Farnborough, to serve doing applied aeronautical science alongside George Paget Thomson.

Returning to Cambridge after the war he graduated MA and then continued as a postgraduate, receiving a PhD from Imperial College London in 1924. He next travelled to California to work at the Mount Wilson Observatory with Robert Millikan for two years.

Aged only 30 he received the post of Professor of Natural Philosophy at Aberdeen University.

He was elected a Fellow of the Royal Society of Edinburgh in 1931.

His interest in solar eclipses and especially the Sun's corona during an eclipse, led to several foreign expeditions for observation purposes: including Norway, Malaya, Canada and a politically complex trip to Omsk in Siberia in 1936. A 1947 eclipse expedition to Brazil resulted in the loss of three staff due to a plane crash near Dakar in West Africa crash.

He was knighted in 1953 thereafter being known as Sir John Carroll.

From 1964 to 68 Carroll was Professor of Astronomy at Gresham College, London.

He suffered a heart attack in 1972 and spent the final two years of his life in ill health. He died on 2 May 1974.

== Family ==
He married twice, firstly in 1930 and secondly in 1951, the latter being to Jean Leslie Pole.

He had one child by his first wife and two by the second.

== Contributions to the development of computing ==
Whilst Professor of Natural Philosophy at Aberdeen University, Carroll had been interested in acquiring desk computing machines for his students. These greatly reduced the labour in producing the mathematical tables needed in astronomy and other fields, including gunnery. In 1942 he became assistant director of research at the Scientific Research and Experiment Department, an Admiralty body which coordinated naval research departments. With Donald Sadler and John Todd, he formed the Admiralty Computing Service in 1943, which itself formed the basis for the NPL Mathematics Division when the Second World War ended in 1945. The NPL Maths Division offered a practical computing service and was also a centre of research into electronic computing and numerical analysis.

== See also ==
- list of Gresham Professors of Astronomy
