= Yapp telescope =

Telescope in the United Kingdom

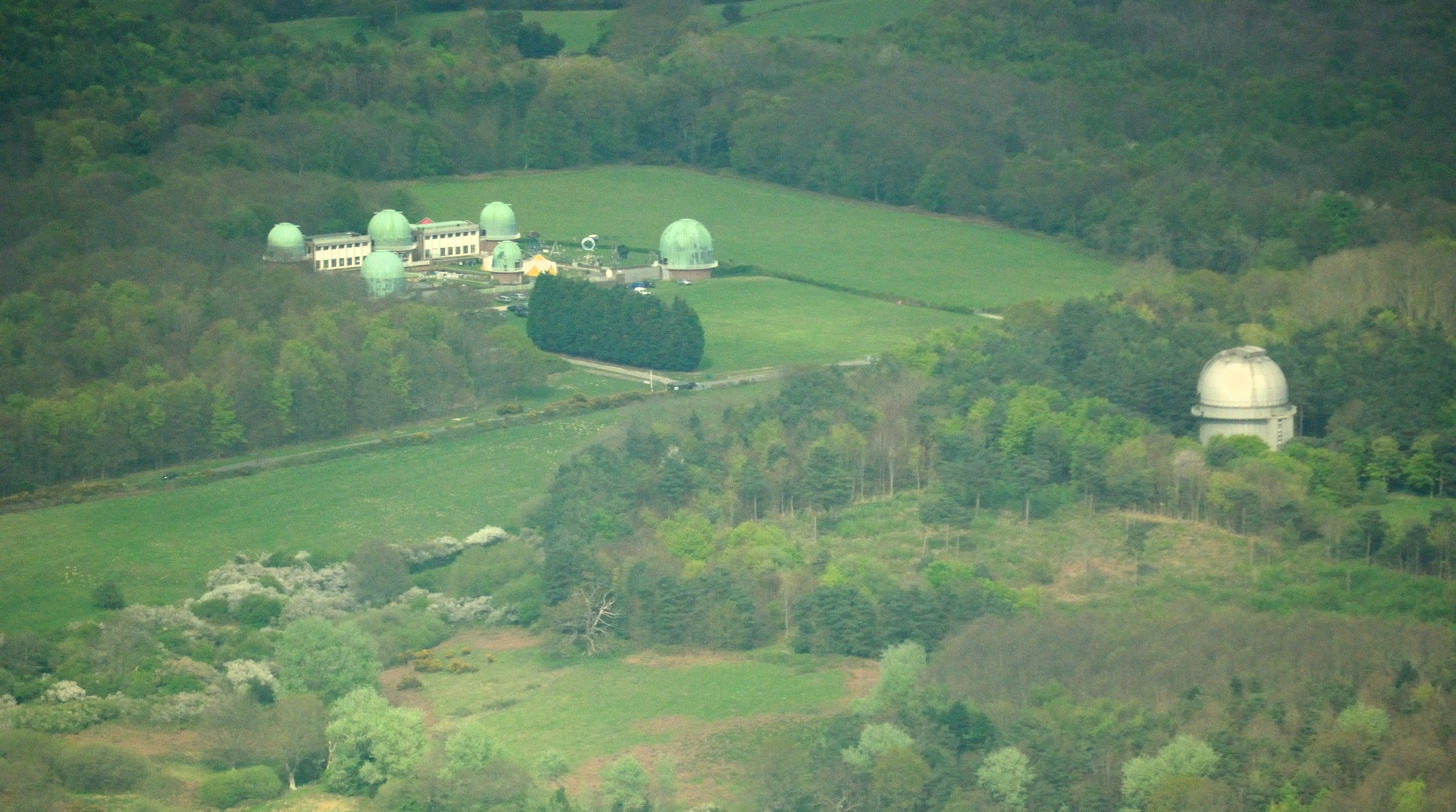
- The Yapp telescope is in the facility in the upper left

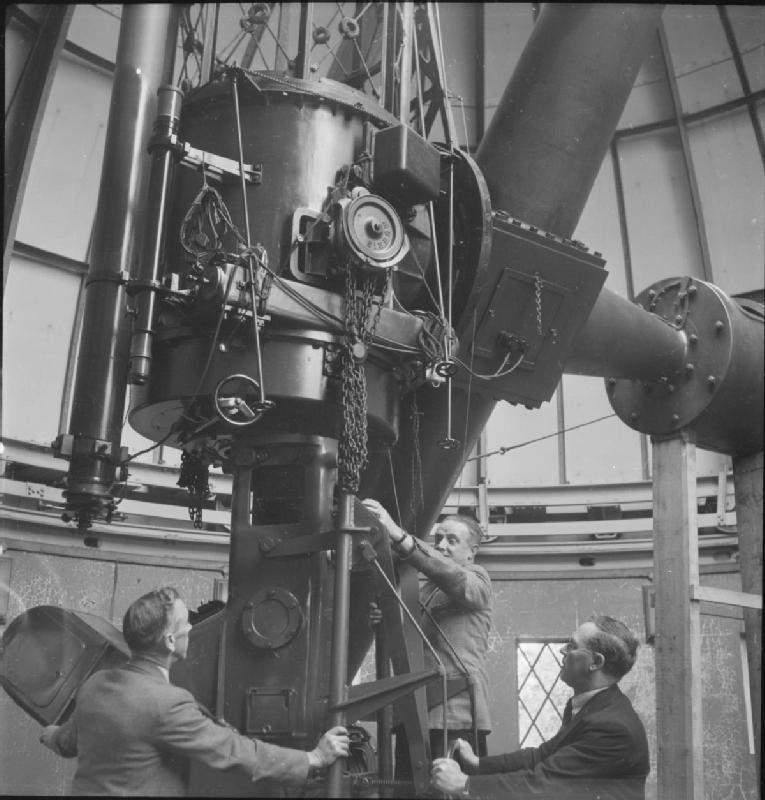
Yapp reflector at Greenwich, 1945

The Yapp telescope is a 36-inch (3 foot / ~91.44 cm) reflecting telescope of the United Kingdom, now located at the Observatory Science Centre at Herstmonceux.

== Greenwich ==
The telescope was ordered from Grubb Parsons in 1931 by the Royal Observatory, Greenwich, and installed in a new dome building there. With a reflecting mirror 36 inches wide (91 cm) and a focal length of 4.57 meters (15 ft), it was the largest telescope in use at the Observatory in Greenwich until the late 1950s. Instruments for the Yapp reflector included two spectrographs, but also had an option for an eyepiece. It was overall a Cassegrain reflecting design on an equatorial mounting, and it had a 6-inch guide telescope also. One of the spectrographs was made by Adam Hilger, Ltd, and was delivered in 1937.

The telescope was inaugurated on 2 June 1934 (Visitation day), opened by the First Lord of the Admiralty. The Royal Astronomer was there and noted that it had been 40 years since a large telescope was added to the observatory. The Yapp building dome was completed in 1932, and the telescope is located in area called the Christie Enclosure in Greenwich Park, with the building about 350 yards (320 meters) east of the main Observatory buildings.

The drive for the equatorial, as well as dome rotation was done with electric motors. The original Yapp dome building at Greenwich was red brick, with a dome of iron lattice with paper mache covered with copper.

== Herstmonceux ==
In the late 1950s the telescope was taken down and moved to Herstmonceux (the whole institution was being relocated) where it was put in Dome B.

The Yapp dome building in Greenwich was taken down and sent to the Royal Observatory, Cape of Good Hope to house the planned Elizabeth telescope.

The Herstmonceux site was used as an observatory into the 1980s, after which it then transition to a popular science museum, and the Yapp telescope remains there. The site closed in 1990s for astronomy and has been a noted tourist and education attraction, with preserved telescopes like the Yapp providing an example of a reflecting telescope.

This was one of the biggest at Herstmonceux until the 98-inch Isaac Newton Telescope was commissioned in 1967, which was moved to La Palma island off the coast of Spain by the 1980s. There was also a 38-inch Hargreaves telescope at Herstmonceux, but it was not put into action particularly.

== Operations ==
An example of astronomical studies done with Yapp reflector, is Spectroscopic Observations of the Be Stars η Cen, γ Cas and Φ Per. This was a study done in the 1970s, with the Yapp using an echelle spectrograph to record the data.

In 1984, the Yapp telescope was tested with an echelle spectrograph from Queen's University Belfast and a CCD camera. Observations of the stars Alpha Cygni (Deneb) and Alpha Boo (Acturus) using this instrumentation on the 90 cm (36-inch) Yapp reflector were conducted in the summer of 1984. The results were published in the 1985 research paper High dispersion spectroscopy trials using an echelle spectrograph with CCD camera.

The Yapp telescope along with the 98-inch Herstmonceux Isaac Newton Telescope collected observations on stellar radial velocities between 1964 and 1971.

== See also ==
- List of largest optical telescopes in the British Isles
- List of largest optical telescopes in the 20th century
