= Prime meridian (Greenwich) =

Meridian passing through Greenwich, London

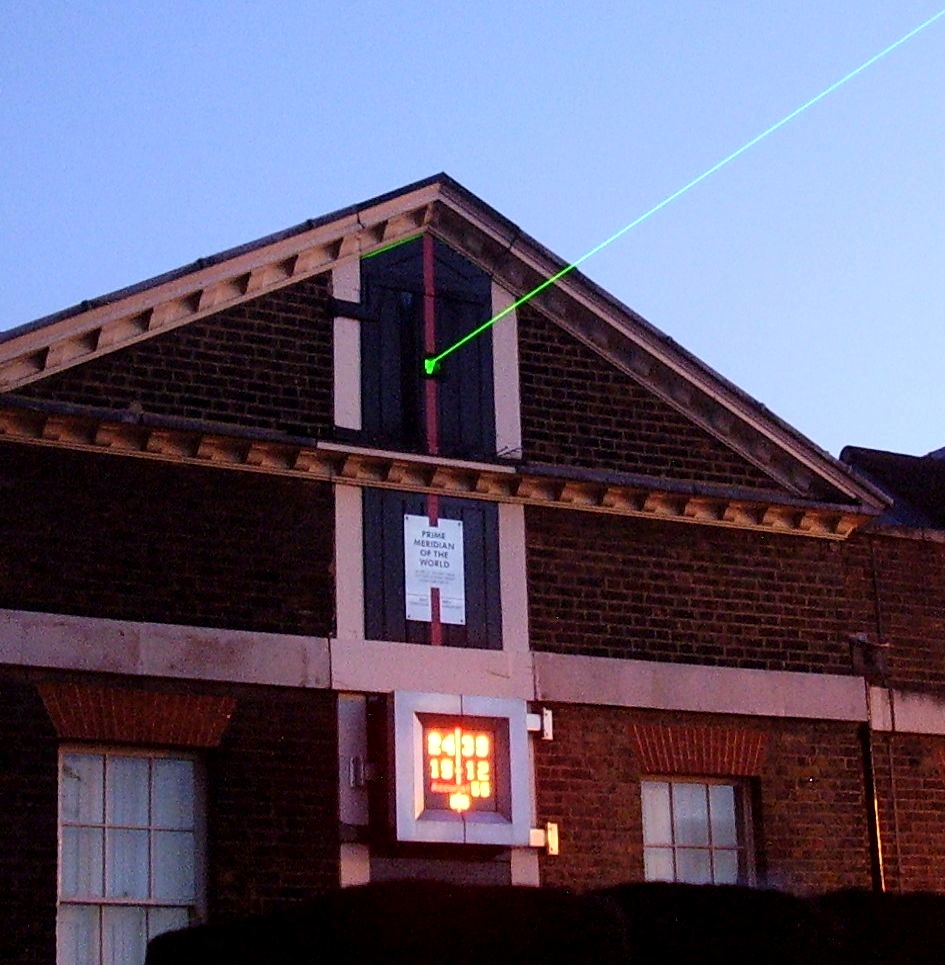
Laser projected from the Royal Observatory, marking the prime meridian of Greenwich

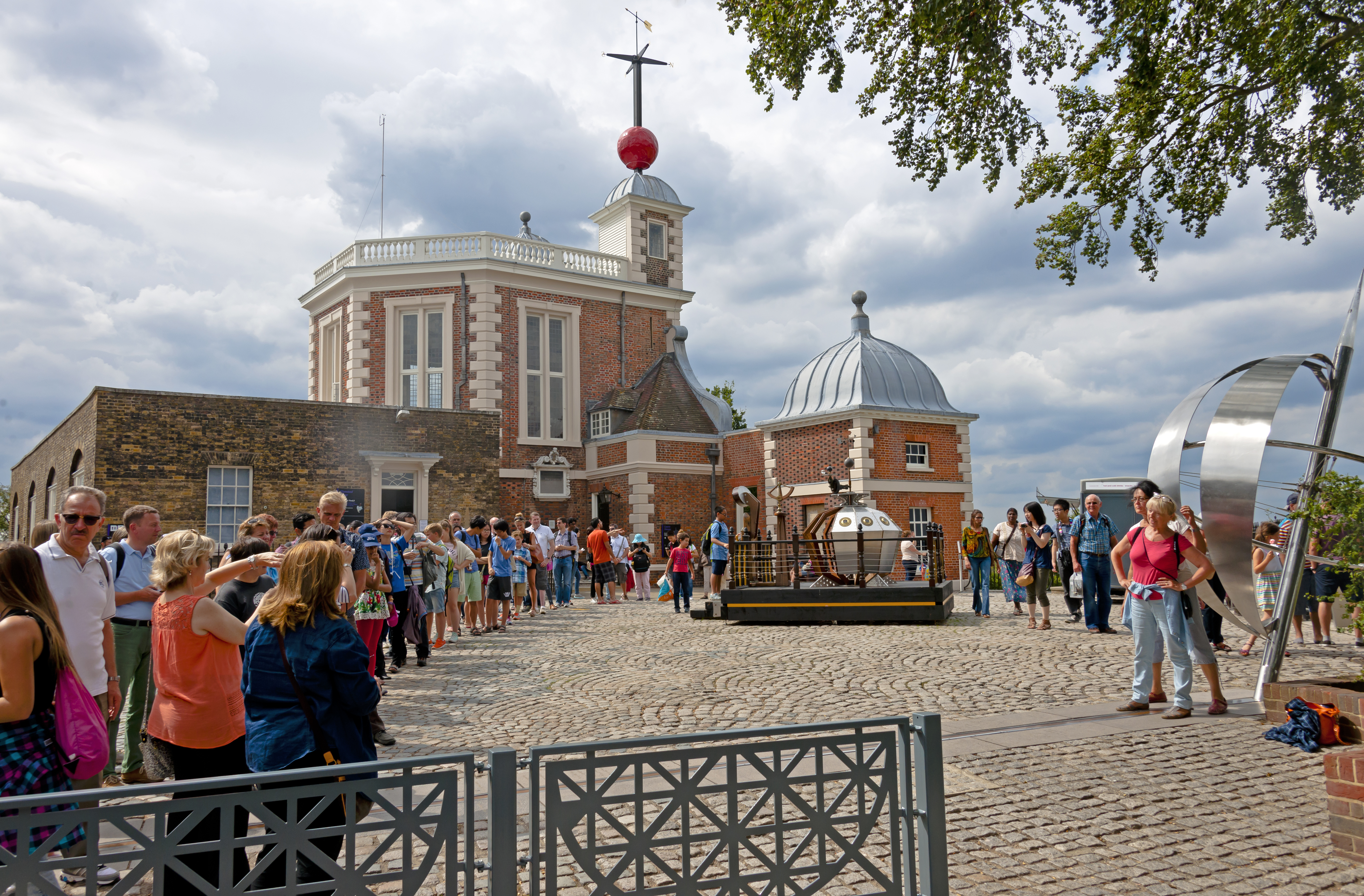
Tourists queuing to take pictures on the brass line marking the prime meridian at the Royal Observatory, Greenwich

The Greenwich meridian is a prime meridian, a geographical reference line that passes through the Royal Observatory, Greenwich, in London, England. From 1884 to 1974, the Greenwich meridian was the international standard prime meridian, used worldwide for timekeeping and navigation. The modern standard, the IERS Reference Meridian, is based on the Greenwich meridian, but differs slightly from it. This prime meridian (at the time, one of many) was first established by Sir George Airy (in 1851). In 1883, the International Geodetic Association formally recommended to governments that the meridian through Greenwich be adopted as the international standard prime meridian. In October of the following year, at the invitation of the president of the United States, 41 delegates from 25 nations met in Washington, D.C., United States, for the International Meridian Conference. This inter-governmental conference selected the meridian passing through Greenwich as the world standard prime meridian. (Note: Voting took place on 13 October and the resolutions were adopted on 22 October 1884.) However, France abstained from the vote, and French maps continued to use the Paris meridian for several decades.

The plane of the prime meridian contains the local gravity vector at the Airy transit circle instrument (51°28′40.1″N 0°0′5.3″W) of the Greenwich observatory. The prime meridian was therefore long symbolised by a brass strip in the courtyard, now replaced by stainless steel, and since 16 December 1999, it has been marked by a powerful green laser shining north across the London night sky.

Satellite navigation devices show that the marking strip for the prime meridian at Greenwich is not exactly at zero longitude (zero degrees, zero minutes, and zero seconds) but at approximately 5.3 seconds of arc to the west of the meridian, meaning that the meridian appears to be 102 metres east. In the past, this offset has been attributed to the establishment of reference meridians for space-based location systems such as WGS-84 (which the GPS relies on) or to the fact that errors gradually crept into the International Time Bureau timekeeping process. However, the discrepancy matches (up to expected measurement error) the vertical deflection between geodetic coordinates (defined in terms of a reference ellipsoid, and used in most astronomical applications) and those defined by astronomical measurements (based on the local direction of gravity); thus, no systematic rotation of global longitudes occurred between the former astronomical system and the current geodetic system.

== History ==
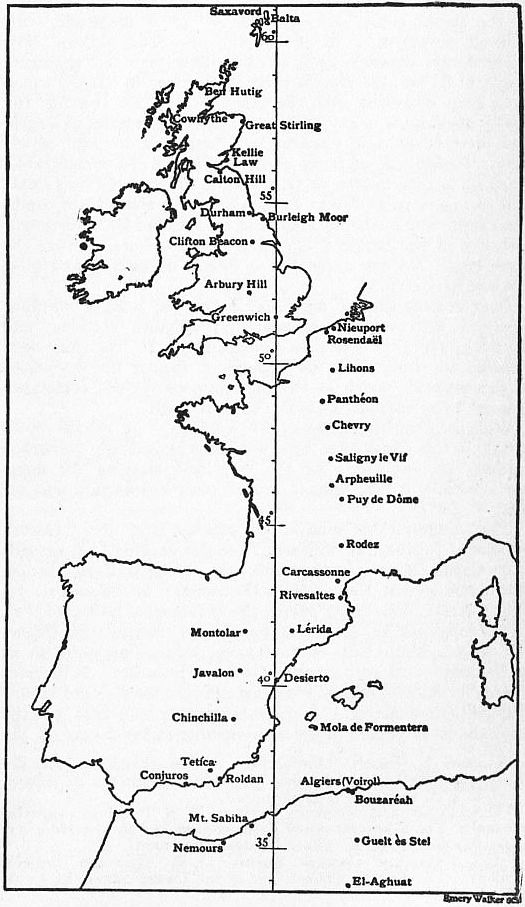
The line down the middle of this 1911 map is the prime meridian, shown passing through Greenwich. Saxavord and Balta at the top of the map are in the Shetland Islands, the most northerly parts of Scotland and the United Kingdom. Shetland lies 1° W of the prime meridian.

Before the establishment of a common international prime meridian, most maritime countries established their own prime meridians, usually passing through the national observatory or other landmark in the country in question. In January 1851, the Royal Observatory at Greenwich established the prime meridian for Great Britain.

In the 19th century, astronomers and geodesists were concerned with questions of longitude and time, because they were responsible for determining them scientifically and used them continually in their studies. The European Arc Measurement, the international association that had covered Europe with a network of fundamental longitudes, took an interest in the question of an internationally-accepted prime meridian at its seventh general conference in Rome in 1883. Indeed, the association was already providing national administrations with the bases for topographical surveys, and engineers with the fundamental benchmarks for their levelling. It seemed natural that it should contribute to the achievement of significant progress in navigation, cartography and geography, as well as in the service of major communications institutions, railways and telegraphs. From a scientific point of view, to be a candidate for the status of international prime meridian, the proponent needed to satisfy three important criteria. According to the report by Carlos Ibáñez e Ibáñez de Ibero, it must have a first-rate astronomical observatory, be directly linked by astronomical observations to other nearby observatories, and be attached to a network of first-rate triangles in the surrounding country. Four major observatories could satisfy these requirements: Greenwich, Paris, Berlin and Washington. The conference concluded that Greenwich Observatory best corresponded to the geographical, nautical, astronomical and cartographic conditions that guided the choice of an international prime meridian, and recommended the governments should adopt it as the world standard. The Conference further hoped that, if the whole world agreed on the unification of longitudes and times by the Association's choosing the Greenwich meridian, Great Britain might respond in favour of the unification of weights and measures, by adhering to the Metre Convention.

In 1884, the International Meridian Conference (of government representatives) took place in Washington, D.C. to establish an internationally-recognised single meridian. The meridian chosen was that which passed through the Airy transit circle at Greenwich, and it became the prime meridian of the world for a century. In 1984 it was superseded in that role by the IERS Reference Meridian which, at this latitude, runs about 102 metres to the east of the Greenwich meridian.

At around the time of the 1884 conference, scientists were making measurements to determine the deflection of the vertical on a large scale. One might expect that plumb lines set up in various locations, if extended downward, would all pass through a single point, the centre of Earth, but this is not the case, primarily due to Earth being an ellipsoid, not a sphere. The downward extended plumb lines don't even all intersect the rotation axis of Earth; this much smaller effect is due to the uneven distribution of Earth's mass. To make computations feasible, scientists defined ellipsoids of revolution, more closely emulating the shape of Earth, modified for a particular zone; a published ellipsoid would be a good base line for measurements. The difference between the direction of a plumb line or vertical, and a line perpendicular to the surface of the ellipsoid of revolution – a normal to said ellipsoid – at a particular observatory, is the deflection of the vertical.

== IERS Reference Meridian ==
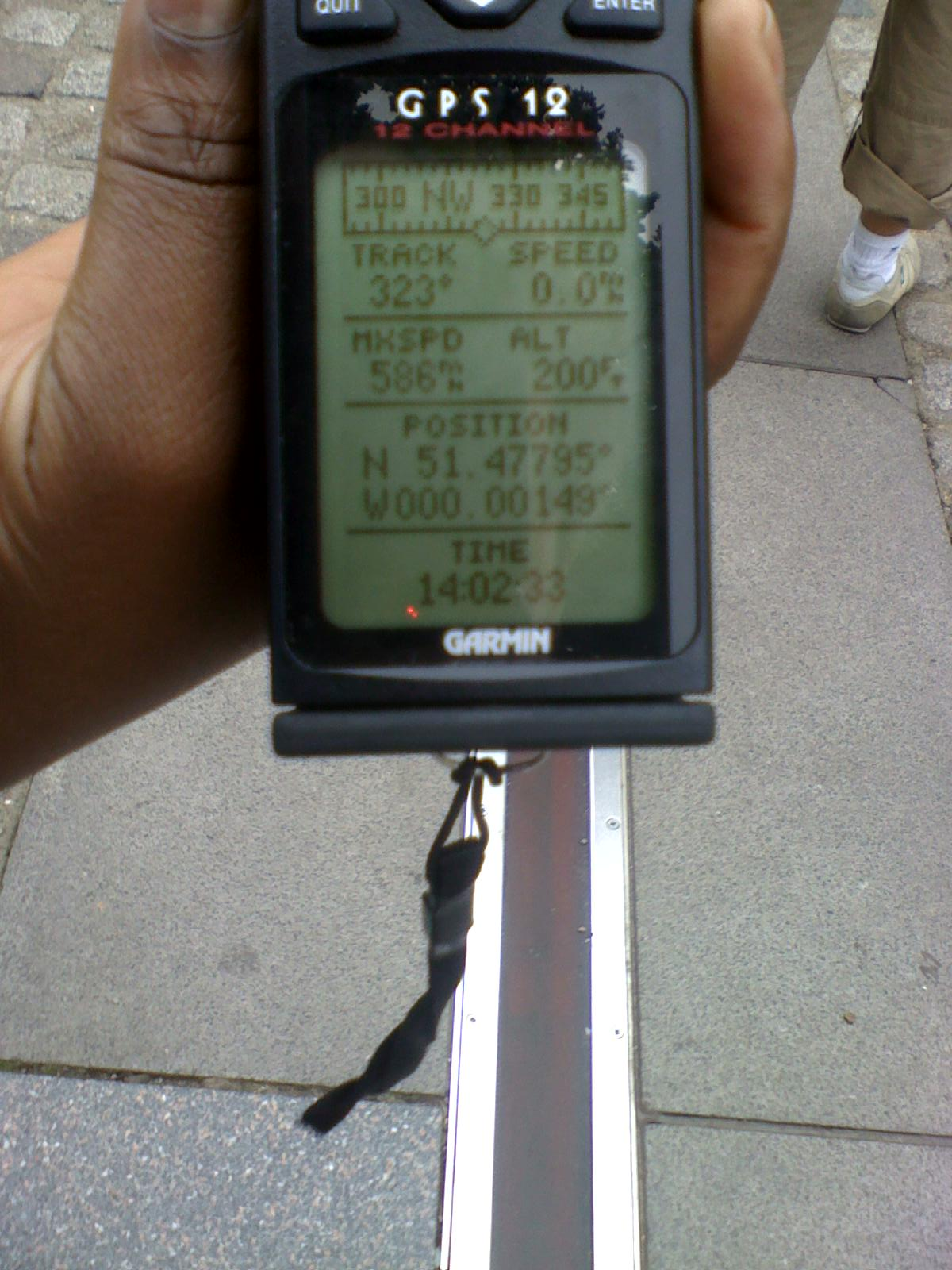
A GPS receiver at the marking strip of the Greenwich Meridian in front of the Royal Observatory. The indicated longitude is not exactly zero because the geodetic zero meridian on a geocentric reference ellipsoid (which is what GPS positioning yields, using the IERS Reference Meridian) is 102 metres east of this strip.

When the Airy transit circle was built, a mercury basin was used to align the telescope to the perpendicular. Thus the circle was aligned with the local vertical or plumb line, which is deflected slightly from the normal, or line perpendicular, to the reference ellipsoid used to define geodetic latitude and longitude in the International Terrestrial Reference Frame (which is nearly the same as the WGS84 system used by the GPS). While Airy's local vertical, set by the apparent centre of gravity of Earth still points to (aligns with) the modern celestial meridian (the intersection of the prime meridian plane with the celestial sphere), it does not pass through Earth's rotation axis. As a result of this, the ITRF zero meridian, defined by a plane passing through Earth's rotation axis, is 102.478 metres to the east of the prime meridian. A 2015 analysis by Malys et al. shows the offset between the former and the latter can be explained by this deflection of the vertical alone; other possible sources of the offset that have been proposed in the past are smaller than the current uncertainty in the deflection of the vertical, locally. The astronomical longitude of the Greenwich prime meridian was found to be 0.19″ ± 0.47″ E, i.e. the plane defined by the local vertical on the Greenwich prime meridian and the plane passing through Earth's rotation axis on the ITRF zero meridian are effectively parallel. Claims, such as that on the BBC website, that the gap between astronomical and geodetic coordinates means that any measurements of transit time across the IRTF zero meridian will occur precisely 0.352 seconds (or 0.353 sidereal seconds) before the transit across the "intended meridian" are based on a failure of understanding. The explanation by Malys et al. on the other hand is more studied and correct.

== Meridian today ==
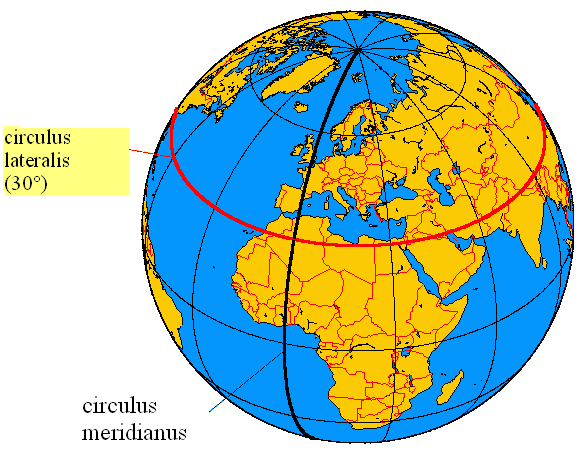
Greenwich meridian and Earth

The Greenwich meridian passes through eight countries in Europe and Africa from north to south:

1. United Kingdom (specifically, only England)
2. France
3. Spain
4. Algeria
5. Mali
6. Burkina Faso
7. Togo
8. Ghana

It also passes through Antarctica, only touching Queen Maud Land, a territorial claim of Norway, on its way from the North Pole to the South Pole.

It crosses the maritime exclusive economic zones of:

1. Greenland (Denmark)
2. Norway (via proximity to Svalbard, Jan Mayen Island, and the Norwegian mainland in the North Atlantic, and Bouvet Island in the South Atlantic)

== See also ==
- Arc measurement of Delambre and Méchain
- 180th meridian
- Prime meridian
- United Kingdom Ordnance Survey Zero Meridian

== Sources ==
- Hirsch, A.; von Oppolzer, Th., eds. (1884). "Rapport de la Commission chargée d'examiner les propositions du bureau de l'Association sur l'unification des longitudes et des heures" [Report of the Commission charged with examining the proposals of the Bureau of the Association on the unification of longitudes and times.]. Comptes-rendus des seances de la Septiéme Conférence Géodésique Internationale pour la mesure des degrés en Europe. Reunie a Rome du 15 au 24 Octobre 1863 [Proceedings of the Seventh International Geodesic Conference for the measurement of degrees in Europe. Held in Rome from 15 to 24 October, 1863] (in French). Berlin: G. Reimer.
