= William Samuel Stratford =

English astronomer (1789–1853)

William Samuel Stratford (22 May 1789 – 29 March 1853) was an English astronomer born in Eltham, Surrey.

He joined the Royal Navy in 1806 under the command of Sir Sidney Smith. In 1815, he retired at half-pay with the rank of lieutenant.

He won a silver medal from the Royal Astronomical Society in 1827; this was the second and last occasion on which such medals were awarded, with the society awarding only gold medals thereafter. He was Secretary of the society from 1825 to 1831.

From 1831 until his death he was Superintendent of HM Nautical Almanac Office. He was elected a Fellow of the Royal Society in June 1832

== See also ==
- O'Byrne, William Richard (1849). "Stratford, William Samuel" . A Naval Biographical Dictionary . John Murray – via Wikisource.
