= Donald Sadler =

Donald Harry Sadler
- Born: 22 August 1908; Dewsbury, Yorkshire, England
- Died: 24 October 1987 (aged 79); Bexhill-on-Sea, East Sussex, England
- Occupation: Superintendent of the Nautical Almanac Office
- Spouse: Flora Sadler

Donald Harry Sadler (22 August 1908 – 24 October 1987) was an English astronomer and mathematician who developed an international reputation for his work in preparing astronomical and navigational almanacs. He worked as the Superintendent of His Majesty's Nautical Almanac Office from 1937 to 1971.

== Early life ==
Donald Sadler was born in Dewsbury, Yorkshire, on 22 August 1908. He attended the local grammar school where he excelled in mathematics. He studied mathematics at the University of Cambridge and received a first-class degree in 1929.

Sadler developed an interest in celestial mechanics during his studies at Cambridge. He contributed to the work of the Computing Section of the British Astronomical Association.

== The Nautical Almanac Office ==
Sadler began work as an assistant at His Majesty's Nautical Almanac Office in 1930, working under the direction of the Superintendent, Leslie Comrie, when it was based at the Royal Naval College in Greenwich, London. Sadler was promoted to Deputy Superintendent of the Office in 1933.

Comrie left the Nautical Almanac Office in 1936. A decision was taken to move the Office to the Royal Observatory, Greenwich, placing it under the direction of the Astronomer Royal, and Sadler was appointed a Chief Assistant at the observatory. Sadler was appointed Comrie's successor as Superintendent of the Nautical Almanac Office in 1937. Sadler was the eighth person to occupy this post since it was created in 1818.

Sadler took on the task of consolidating projects begun by Comrie, publishing new tables for use in navigation. The Second World War soon intervened and the Nautical Almanac Office was moved temporarily out of London to the safer environment of Bath. The Office expanded in size temporarily to prepare data for military use. Sadler was awarded the OBE in 1948 in recognition of this work.

Sadler supervised the relocation of the Nautical Almanac Office in 1949 from Bath to the new home of the Royal Greenwich Observatory at Herstmonceux Castle in Sussex. He expanded the use of calculating machines in astronomical calculations. He increased international cooperation in preparing astronomical tables, particularly with the United States Naval Observatory.

In 1954 Sadler married his colleague, Flora Sadler (née McBain), in what was described as 'the astronomical romance of the decade'.

Donald Sadler oversaw the transfer of the Nautical Almanac Office within the Royal Greenwich Observatory from the control of the Admiralty to the new Science Research Council.

He was awarded the Prix Jules Janssen by the Société astronomique de France in 1972.

== Scientific societies ==
Donald Sadler became a fellow of the Royal Astronomical Society in 1931, and served on the society's council. He acted as a secretary between 1939 and 1947, contributing to sustaining the society's work during the war. He served as the society's president from 1967 to 1969.

Sadler contributed to other scientific societies, including the Royal Institute of Navigation, of which he was president from 1953 to 1955. He served as general secretary of the International Astronomical Union (1958–1964), then as vice-president, and president (1968–1970) of the Council of the Federation of Astronomical and Geophysical Services.

In 1981, Sadler became a founding member of the World Cultural Council.

== Later life ==
Donald Sadler retired as Superintendent of the Nautical Almanac Office in 1971. He continued working at the office for a further year, retiring in February 1972. Sadler continued with his activities in the Royal Institute of Navigation.

Donald Sadler died at Bexhill-on-Sea, East Sussex, on 24 October 1987.
