= Royal Observatory, Greenwich =

Observatory in London, England

Royal Observatory
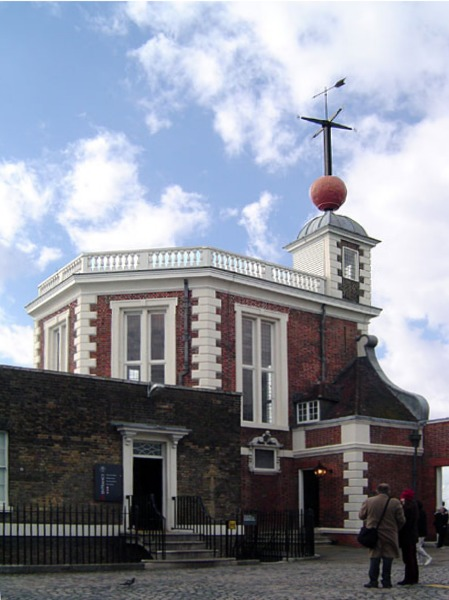
- Royal Observatory, Greenwich. A time ball sits atop the Octagon Room.

- Alternative names: Royal Greenwich Observatory
- Observatory code: 000
- Location: Greenwich, London, England
- Coordinates: 51.477°N 0.0147°W
- Altitude: 68 m (223 ft)
- Website: www.rmg.co.uk/royal-observatory/
- Telescopes: Altazimuth Pavilion At The Royal Observatory
- Related media on Commons

The Royal Observatory, Greenwich (ROG; known as the Old Royal Observatory from 1957 to 1998, when the working Royal Greenwich Observatory, RGO, temporarily moved south from Greenwich to Herstmonceux) is an observatory situated on a hill in Greenwich Park in south east London, overlooking the River Thames to the north. It played a major role in the history of astronomy and navigation, and because the Prime Meridian passed through it, it gave its name to Greenwich Mean Time, the precursor to today's Coordinated Universal Time (UTC). The ROG has the IAU observatory code of 000, the first in the list. ROG, the National Maritime Museum, the Queen's House and the clipper ship Cutty Sark are collectively designated Royal Museums Greenwich.

The observatory was commissioned in 1675 by King Charles II, with the foundation stone being laid on 10 August. The old hilltop site of Greenwich Castle was chosen by Sir Christopher Wren, a former Savilian Professor of Astronomy; as Greenwich Park was a royal estate, no new land needed to be bought. At that time the King also created the position of Astronomer Royal, to serve as the director of the observatory and to "apply himself with the most exact care and diligence to the rectifying of the tables of the motions of the heavens, and the places of the fixed stars, so as to find out the so much desired longitude of places for the perfecting of the art of navigation." He appointed John Flamsteed as the first Astronomer Royal. The building was completed in the summer of 1676. The building was often called "Flamsteed House", in reference to its first occupant.

The scientific work of the observatory was relocated elsewhere in stages in the first half of the 20th century, and the Greenwich site is now maintained almost exclusively as a museum, although the Annie Maunder Astrographic Telescope (AMAT) telescope became operational for astronomical research in 2018.

== History ==
=== Chronology ===
- 1675 – 22 June, The Royal Observatory founded by Charles II.
- 1675 – 10 August, construction began.
- 1714 - The Longitude Act established the Board of Longitude and Longitude rewards. The Astronomer Royal was, until the Board was dissolved in 1828, always an ex officio Commissioner of Longitude.
- 1767 - The fifth Astronomer Royal Nevil Maskelyne began publication of The Nautical Almanac, based on observations made at the Observatory.
- 1818 - Oversight of the Royal Observatory was transferred from the Board of Ordnance to the Board of Admiralty; at that time the observatory was charged with maintaining the Royal Navy's marine chronometers.
- 1833 - Daily time signals began, marked by dropping a time ball.
- 1838 - Sheepshanks equatorial, a 6.7 inches (170 mm) aperture refracting telescope installed.
- 1852 - Time signals were distributed through telegraph lines.
- 1884 - The International Meridian Conference in Washington D.C. decides that the Greenwich Prime Meridian should be the Prime meridian for the whole world, which it remains for a century.
- 1893 – The 28-inch Great refractor installed.
- 1899 - The New Physical Observatory (now known as the South Building) was completed.
- 1924 – Hourly time signals (Greenwich Time Signal) from the Royal Observatory were first broadcast on 5 February, originally generated from a Dent astronomical regulator (Dent no. 2016).
- 1931 - Yapp telescope ordered.
- 1948 - Office of the Astronomer Royal was moved to Herstmonceux in East Sussex.
- 1957 - Royal Observatory completed its move to Herstmonceux, becoming the Royal Greenwich Observatory (RGO). The Greenwich site was renamed the Old Royal Observatory.
- 1984 - The IERS Reference Meridian replaces the Greenwich Meridian as the Prime Meridian for the world. Its location is closely related to its predecessor, but runs approximately 102 metres east of it.
- 1990 - RGO moved to Cambridge.
- 1998 - RGO closed. Greenwich site was returned to its original name, the Royal Observatory, Greenwich, and was made part of the National Maritime Museum.
- 2011 - The Greenwich museums, including the ROG, became collectively the Royal Museums Greenwich.

=== Site ===
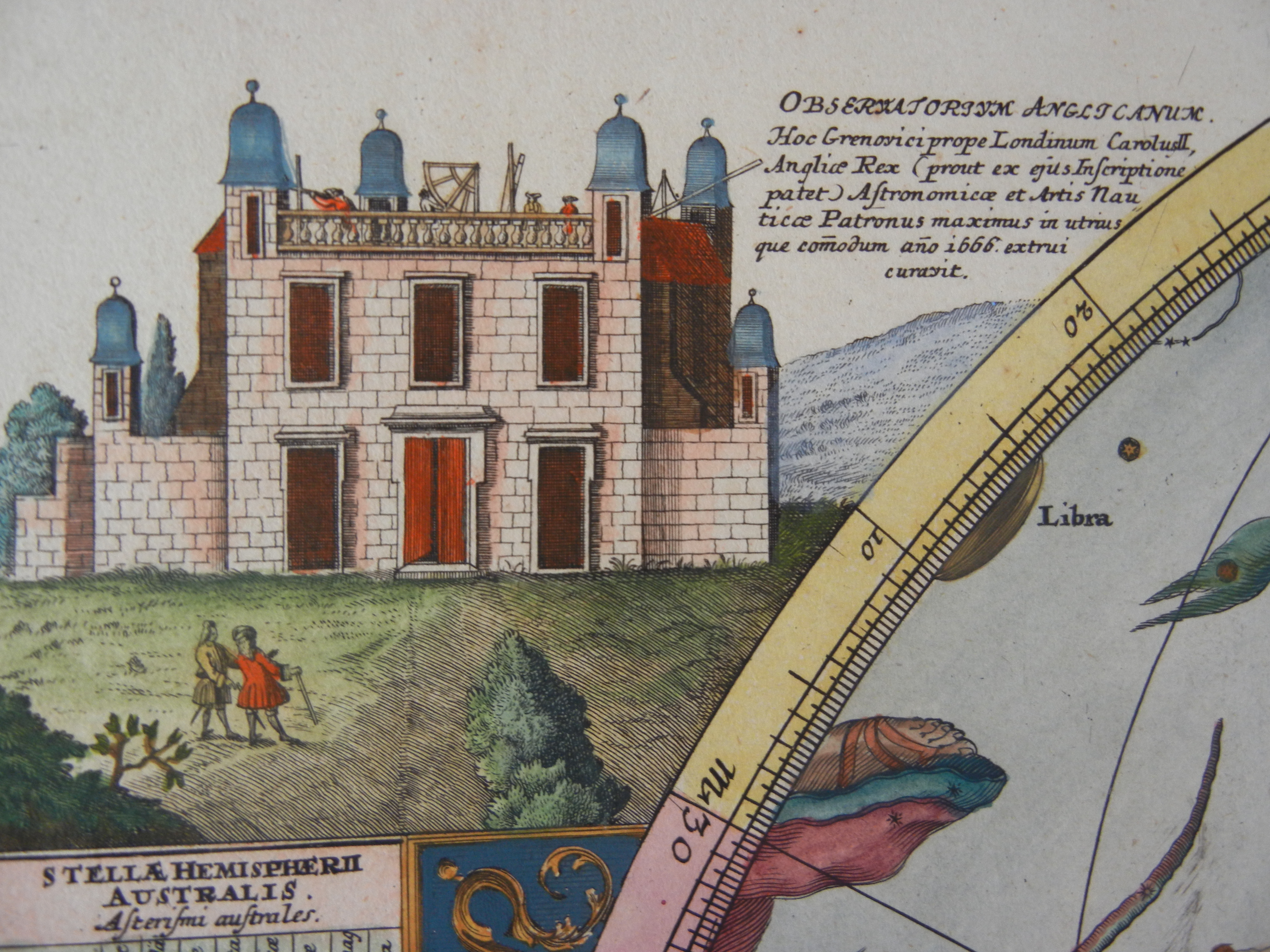
Greenwich Observatory (Latinized as Observatorium Anglicanum Hoc Grenovici prope Londinum), as illustrated in Johann Gabriel Doppelmayr's map of the southern celestial hemisphere, c. 1730

There had been significant buildings on this land since the reign of William I. Greenwich Palace, on the site of the present-day National Maritime Museum, was the birthplace of both Henry VIII and his daughters Mary I and Elizabeth I; the Tudors used Greenwich Castle, which stood on the hilltop that the Observatory presently occupies, as a hunting lodge. Greenwich Castle was reportedly a favourite place for Henry VIII to house his mistresses, so that he could easily travel from the Palace to see them.

In 1676 the main building of the observatory, now known as Flamsteed House, was completed on Greenwich hill.

=== Establishment ===
The establishment of a Royal Observatory was proposed in 1674 by Sir Jonas Moore who, in his role as Surveyor-General of the Ordnance, persuaded King Charles II to create the observatory, with John Flamsteed installed as its director. The Ordnance Office was given responsibility for building the Observatory, with Moore providing the key instruments and equipment for the observatory at his own personal cost. Flamsteed House, the original part of the Observatory, was designed by Sir Christopher Wren, probably assisted by Robert Hooke, and was the first purpose-built scientific research facility in Britain. It was built for a cost of £520 (£20 over budget; equivalent to £91,000 in 2025) out of largely recycled materials on the foundations of Duke Humphrey's Tower, the forerunner of Greenwich Castle, which resulted in the alignment being 13 degrees away from true North, somewhat to Flamsteed's chagrin.

Moore donated two clocks, built by Thomas Tompion, which were installed in the 20-foot-high Octagon Room, the principal room of the building. They were of unusual design, each with a pendulum 13 feet (4.0 metres) in length mounted above the clock face, giving a period of four seconds and an accuracy, then unparalleled, of seven seconds per day.

The original observatory housed the Astronomer Royal, his assistant and his family as well as the scientific instruments to be used by Flamsteed in his work on stellar tables. Over time the institution became a more established institution, thanks to its links to long-lasting government boards (the Board of Ordnance and Board of Longitude) and oversight by a Board of Visitors, founded in 1710 and made up of the President and Members of the council of the Royal Society. By the later 18th century it incorporated additional responsibilities such as publishing The Nautical Almanac, advising government on technical matters, disseminating time, making meteorological and magnetic observations and undertaking astrophotography and spectroscopy. The physical site and the numbers of staff increased over time as a result.

=== Positional astronomy and star charts ===
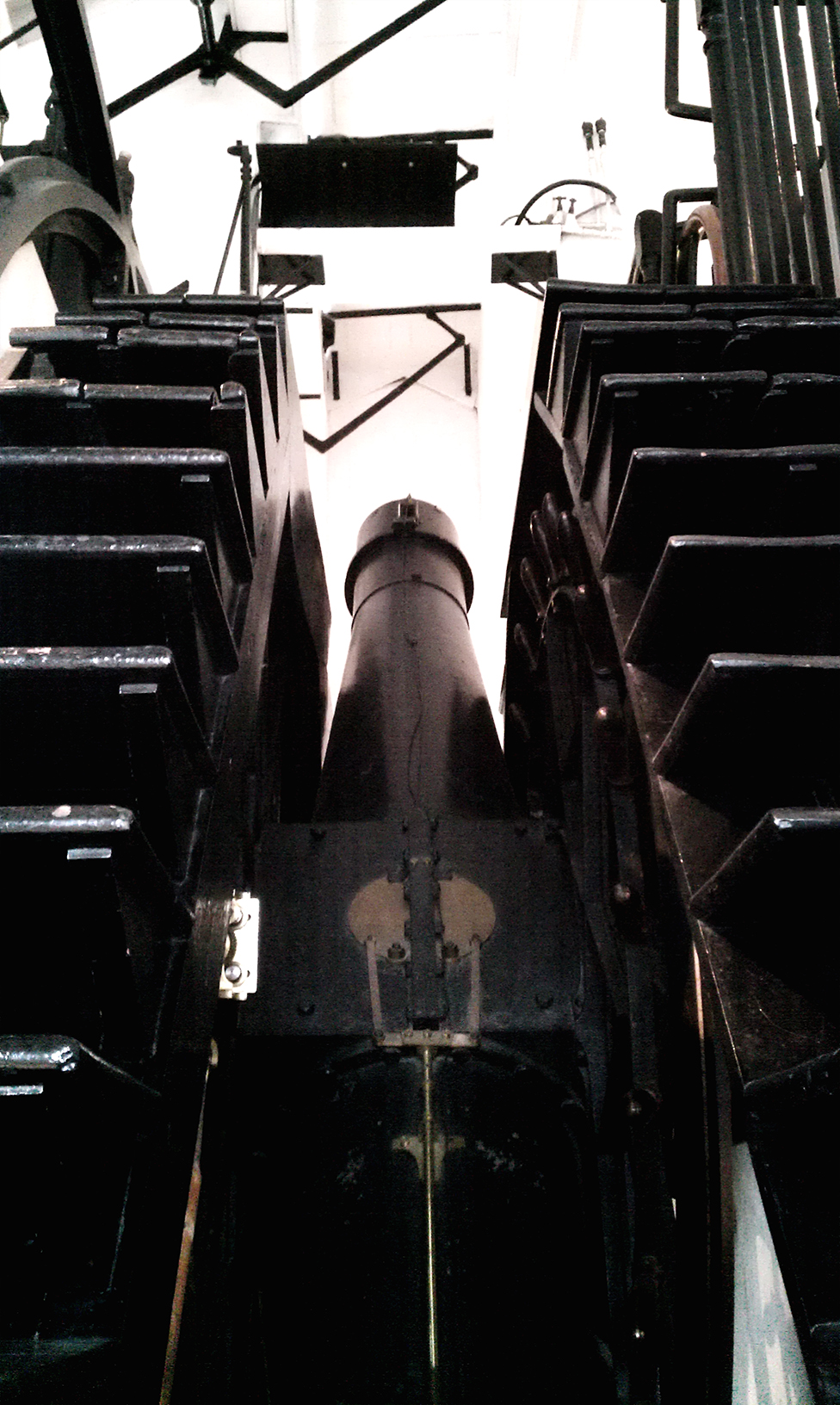
The Airy Transit Circle at the Royal Observatory, Greenwich, used for over a century (1851–1953) as the reference point when charting the heavens and determining times, thus earning for it the epithet "the centre of time and space"

When the observatory was founded in 1675, one of the best star catalogues was Tycho Brahe's 1000-star catalogue from 1598. However, this catalogue was not accurate enough to determine longitudes. One of Flamsteed's first orders of business was creating more accurate charts suitable for this purpose.

One of the noted charts made at Greenwich was by the Astronomer Royal James Bradley, who between 1750 and 1762 charted sixty thousand stars, so accurately his catalogues were used even in the 1940s. Bradley was the third Astronomer Royal, and his tenure started in 1742.

In the early 19th century, the main positional devices were the Troughton Transit instrument and a mural circle, but after George Biddell Airy took over as Astronomer Royal in 1835, he embarked on a plan to have better instruments at Greenwich observatory.

Positional astronomy was one of the primary functions of Greenwich for the Admiralty. Astronomer Royal Airy was an advocate of this and the transit circle instrument he had installed in 1851 was used for a century for positional astronomy. One of the difficulties with positional astronomy, is accounting for the refraction of light through Earth's atmosphere. Sources of error include the precision of the instrumentation, and then there has to be accounting for precession, nutation, and aberration. Sources of error in the instrument have to be tracked down and accounted for to produce more accurate results.

The transit circle makes two measurements; along with a clock, the time a star passed a certain point in the sky as the Earth rotates, and the vertical angle of the location of the star. The instrument can be used to plot the locations of stars, or alternately, with an accurate star chart, the time at the location of the instrument.

=== 1832 transit of Mercury ===
The Shuckburgh telescope of the Royal Observatory in Greenwich was used for the 1832 transit of Mercury. It was equipped with a filar micrometer by Peter Dollond and was used to provide a report of the events as seen through the small refractor. By observing the transit in combination with timing it and taking measures, a diameter for the planet was taken. They also reported the peculiar effects that they compared to pressing a coin into the Sun. The observer remarked:

I afterwards observed, that immediately around the planet there was a dusky tinge, making it appear as if, in a small degree sunk below the sun's surface;"

— Royal Astronomical Society, Vol II, No. 13

=== Greenwich Meridian ===
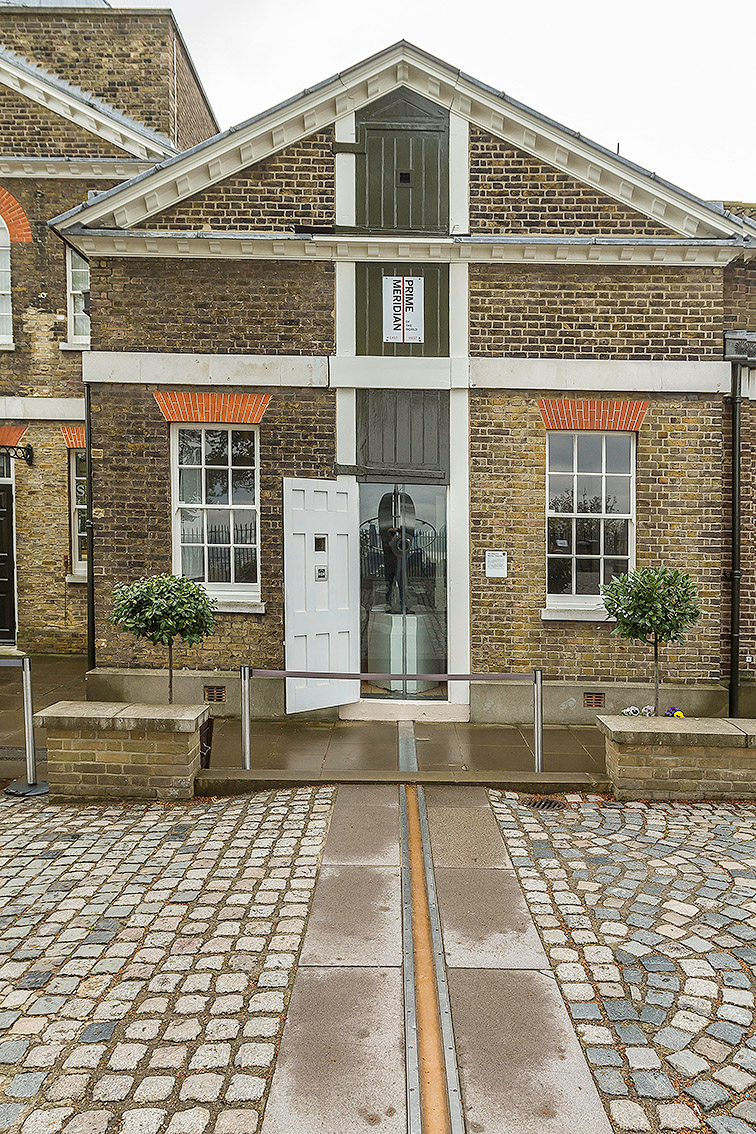
The building housing the origin of the Greenwich Prime Meridian, marked by the brass strip in the foreground. The apex of the roof opens up to the left above the white vertical strips (joints in the eaves are visible), enabling telescopic star sightings to be made.

British astronomers have long used the Royal Observatory as a basis for measurement. Four separate meridians have passed through the buildings, defined by successive instruments. The basis of longitude, the meridian that passes through the Airy transit circle, first used in 1851, was adopted as the world's Prime Meridian at the International Meridian Conference at Washington, DC, on 22 October 1884 (voting took place on 13 October). Subsequently, nations across the world used it as their standard for mapping and timekeeping. The Prime Meridian was marked by a brass (later replaced by stainless steel) strip in the Observatory's courtyard once the buildings became a museum in 1960, and, since 16 December 1999, has been marked by a powerful green laser shining north across the London night sky.

Since the first triangulation of Great Britain in the period 1783–1853, Ordnance Survey maps have been based on an earlier version of the Greenwich meridian, defined by the transit instrument of James Bradley. When the Airy circle (5.79 m to the east) became the reference for the meridian, the difference resulting from the change was considered small enough to be neglected. When a new triangulation was done between 1936 and 1962, scientists determined that in the Ordnance Survey system the longitude of the international Greenwich meridian was not 0° but 0°00'00.417" (about 8 m) east. Besides the change of the reference line, imperfections of the surveying system added another discrepancy to the definition of the origin, so that the Bradley line itself is now 0°00'00.12" east of the Ordnance Survey Zero Meridian (about 2.3 m).

This old astronomical prime meridian has been replaced by a more precise prime meridian. When Greenwich was an active observatory, geographical coordinates were referred to a local oblate spheroid called a datum known as a geoid, whose surface closely matched local mean sea level. Several datums were in use around the world, all using different spheroids, because mean sea level undulates by as much as 100 metres worldwide. Modern geodetic reference systems, such as the World Geodetic System and the International Terrestrial Reference Frame, use a single oblate spheroid, fixed to the Earth's gravitational centre. The shift from several local spheroids to one worldwide spheroid caused all geographical coordinates to shift by many metres, sometimes as much as several hundred metres. The Prime Meridian of these modern reference systems is the IERS Reference Meridian, in full the International Earth Rotation and Reference Systems Service Reference Meridian (in short called the IRM), which is 102.5 metres east of the Airy Greenwich astronomical meridian represented by the stainless steel strip, which is now 5.31 arcseconds west. The modern location of the Airy Transit is 51°28′40.1″N 0°0′5.3″W as the IRM is at 0 degree in longitude nowadays.

International time from the end of the 19th century until UT1 was based on Simon Newcomb's equations, giving a mean sun about 0.18 seconds behind UT1 (the equivalent of 2.7 arcseconds) as of 2013; it coincided in 2013 with a meridian halfway between Airy's circle and the IERS origin: 51°28′40.1247″N 0°0′2.61″W.

=== Greenwich Mean Time ===
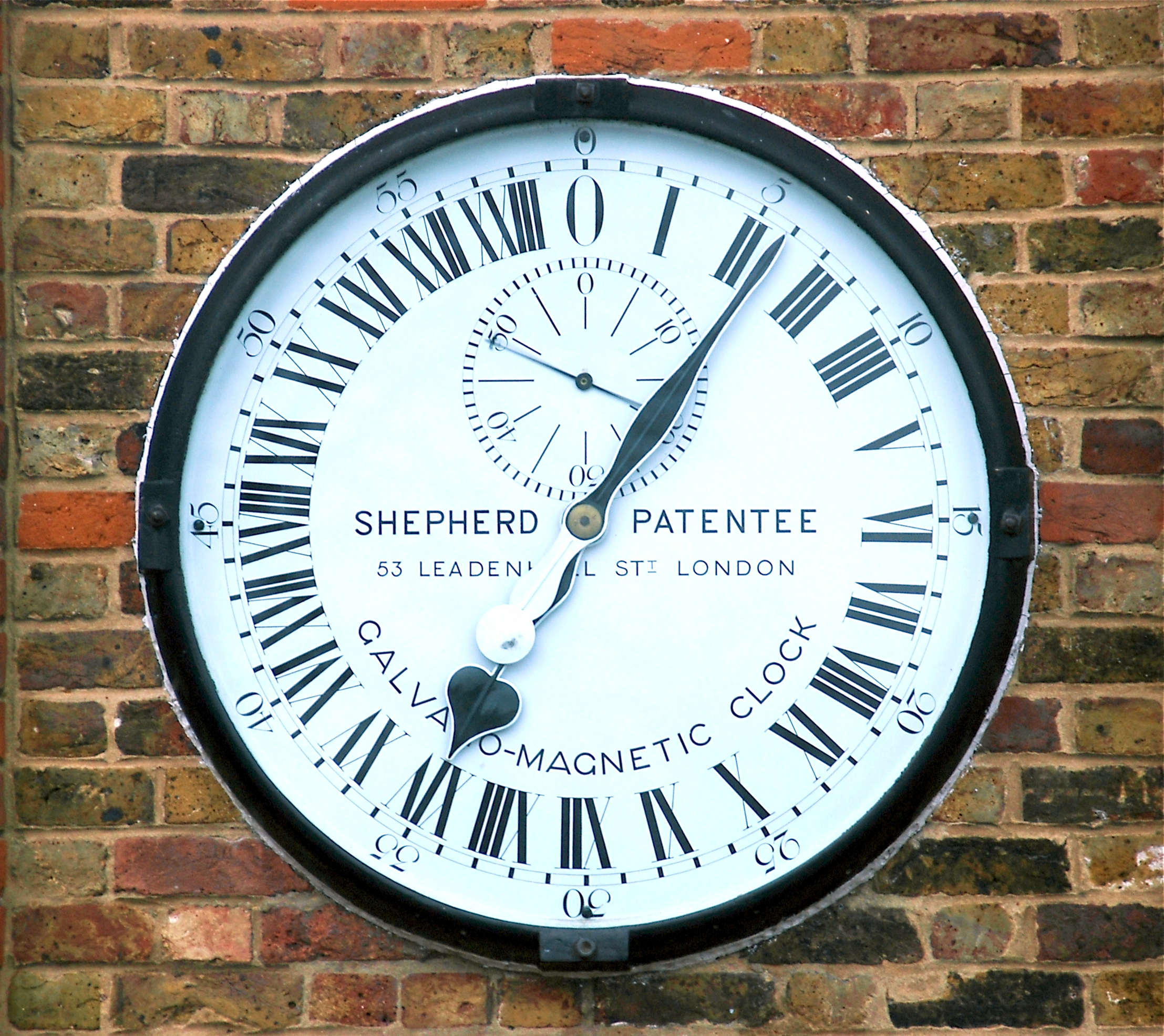
The Shepherd Gate Clock at the gates of the Royal Greenwich Observatory. This clock shows Greenwich Mean Time all year round, ie. it is not set to British Summer Time in the summer.

A key instrument for determining time was the Airy Transit Circle (ATC), which was used primarily from 1851 to 1938. It was agreed that the (Prime) "meridian line marked by the cross-hairs in the Airy Transit Circle eyepiece would indicate 0° longitude and the start of the Universal Day". (Note, however, that this Prime Meridian is obsolete; the ITRF Zero Meridian, which is more than 100 metres east, is the modern standard defining longitude.) The time was determined by marking the time a star of known location would pass through the aimpoint of the telescope. In a reverse case, this type of instrument was also used for making star charts. The stars whose position was known precisely enough for being used for time determination, were called "clock stars".

By 1925, confusion about whether GMT was reckoned from noon or from midnight led (in 1928) to the IAU retiring GMT for astronomical and chronological purposes, replacing it with Universal Time (UT). In 1929, UT was redefined as a statistical combination of multiple observatories. In 1948, the Office of the Astronomer Royal was moved to Herstmonceux in East Sussex and in 1957, the observatory closed, ceasing time measurement operations.

The term "GMT" continues to be promoted by the Observatory and the UK in general, despite no longer being measured in any way. Coordinated Universal Time (UTC) forms the basis of modern civil time, and is based on the best attributes of UT1 (the modern form of UT, now measured from extra-galactic radio sources) and International Atomic Time (TAI, time kept by hyper-accurate clocks).

=== Greenwich Time Ball ===
Video of the Time Ball above the Royal Observatory dropping at 13:00

The red time ball of Greenwich was established in 1833, and is noted as a public time signal. The time ball in modern times is normally in a lowered position, then starting at 12:55 pm, the ball begins to rise, then at 12:58 it reaches the top; at 1 pm the ball drops.

To help mariners at the port and others in line of sight of the observatory to synchronise their clocks to GMT, in 1833 Astronomer Royal John Pond installed a very visible time ball that drops precisely at 1 pm (13:00) every day atop the observatory. Initially it was dropped by an operator; from 1852 it was released automatically via an electric impulse from the Shepherd Master Clock. The ball is still dropped daily at 13:00 (GMT in winter, BST in summer).

The original time ball system was built by Messrs Maudslay and Field, and cost £180. The five-foot diameter ball was made of wood and leather. In the original ball system, it was hoisted by a rope up from the Octagon room, and there was a catch at the top to hold it. This could then be triggered by hand, while observing the time on an astronomical month clock, that was regulated to the mean solar time.

By dropping the ball, the public, mariners, and clock makers could then get a time signal by viewing it from afar. The ball drop would be repeated at 2 pm also if possible.

The reason why 12 noon was not chosen was because astronomers at the observatory would record when the Sun crossed the meridian at that time on that day.

In rare occasions where the ball could get stuck due to icing or snow, and if the wind was too high it would not be dropped. In 1852, it was established to distribute a time signal by the telegraph wires also.

The time ball was extremely popular with the public, chronometers, railways, mariners, and there was a petition to have another time ball established in Southampton also.

=== 1890s ===
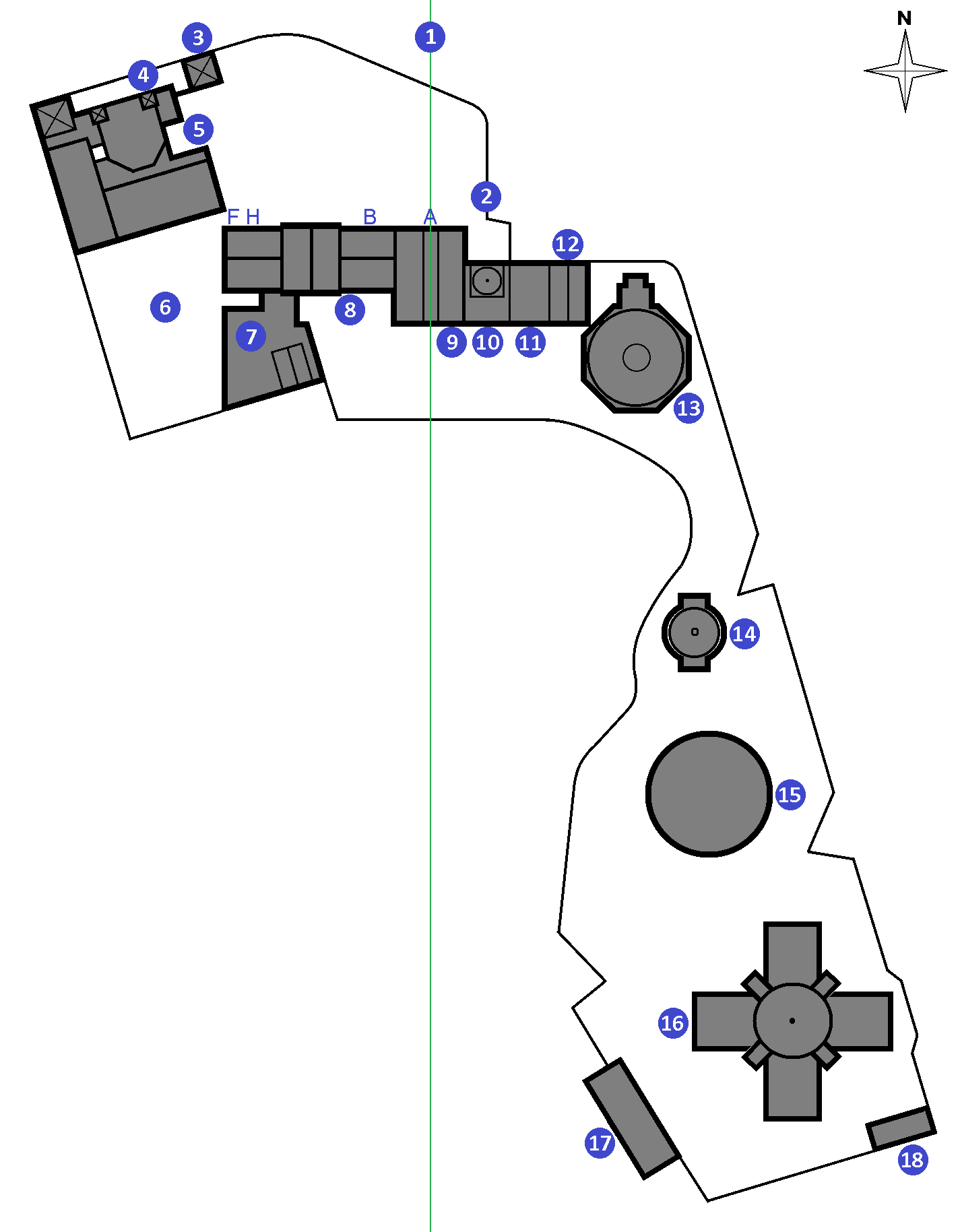
Royal Observatory Greenwich, site plan

The 1890s marked the addition of a new larger refractor, the 28-inch Grubb in the Great Equatorial Dome. Because the new telescope was longer than the old Great Refractor, the new dome had to be bigger; thus the famous "onion dome" that expands beyond the diameter of the turret was established. For the tricentennial, it was revitalized with a fibre-glass dome; the old one made of papier-mâché and iron had been taken down.

The telescope was installed by 1893, with 28-inch diameter glass doublet lens made by Grubb from Chance of Birmingham glass. The new dome was made by T. Cooke and Sons. This replaced a smaller drum-shaped dome.

The Lassell two-foot reflector was a famous metal-mirror telescope that had been used to discover the Moons Triton (orbiting Neptune) and Hyperion (orbiting Saturn). It was donated to the observatory in the 1880s, but was taken down in the 1890s.

The 1890s also saw the construction of the Altazimuth Pavilion, completed in 1896 and designed by William Crisp. In 1898 the Christie Enclosure was established to house sensitive magnetic instruments that had been disrupted by the use of iron at the main facility.

The Observatory underwent an attempted bombing on 15 February 1894. This was possibly the first "international terrorist" incident in Britain. The bomb was accidentally detonated while being held by 26-year-old French anarchist Martial Bourdin in Greenwich Park, near the Observatory building. Bourdin died about 30 minutes later. It is not known why he chose the observatory, or whether the detonation was intended to occur elsewhere. The novelist Joseph Conrad used the incident in his 1907 novel The Secret Agent.

=== Early 20th century ===
For major parts of the twentieth century, the Royal Greenwich Observatory was not at Greenwich, because it moved to Herstmonceux in East Sussex in 1957. The last time that all departments were in Greenwich was 1924: in that year electrification of the railways affected the readings of the Magnetic and Meteorological Departments, and the Magnetic Observatory moved to Abinger in Surrey. Prior to this, the observatory had had to insist that the electric trams in the vicinity could not use an earth return for the traction current.

After the onset of World War II in 1939, many departments were temporarily evacuated out of range of German bombers, to Abinger, Bradford on Avon, Bristol, and Bath, and activities in Greenwich were reduced to the bare minimum.

On 15 October 1940, during the Blitz, the Courtyard gates were destroyed by a direct bomb hit. The wall above the Gate Clock collapsed, and the clock's dial was damaged. The damage was repaired after the war.

=== The Royal Observatory at Herstmonceux ===
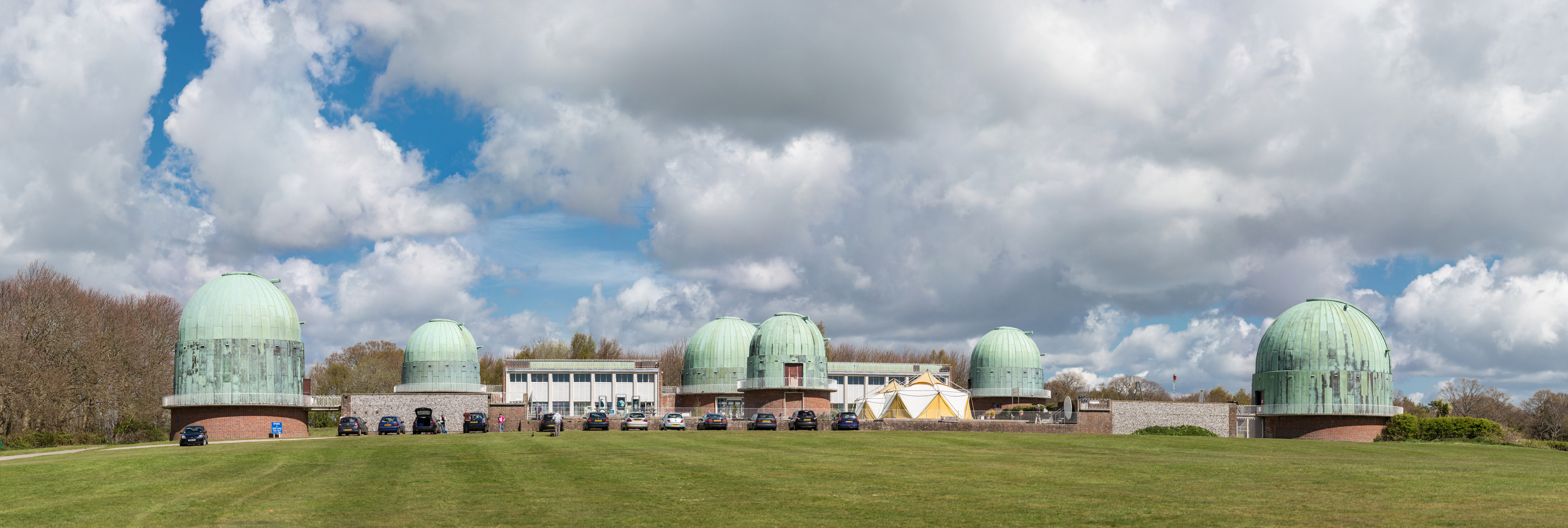
Former Royal Greenwich Observatory, Herstmonceux, East Sussex

After the Second World War, in 1947, the decision was made to move the Royal Observatory to Herstmonceux Castle and 320 adjacent acres (1.3 km^{2}), 70 km south-southeast of Greenwich near Hailsham in East Sussex, due to light pollution in London. The Observatory was officially known as the Royal Greenwich Observatory, Herstmonceux. Although the Astronomer Royal Harold Spencer Jones moved to the castle in 1948, the scientific staff did not move until the observatory buildings were completed, in 1957. Shortly thereafter, other previously dispersed departments were reintegrated at Herstmonceux, such as the Nautical Almanac Office, Chronometer Department, the library, and observing equipment.

The largest telescope at Greenwich at that time, the Yapp telescope 36-inch reflector, was moved out to Herstmonceux in 1958. There it was reconstructed in Dome B of the facility. There it was used for astronomy in the 1960s, 1970s, and 1980s. It was left behind at Herstmonceux in 1990 in its dome when the organization moved once again.

The tricentennial of Sir Isaac Newton had passed during the Second World War, delaying festivities. One of the ground-swells was to build a 'big better' telescope in honour of the celebrated inventor of the Newtonian reflecting telescope. Some two decades of development led to the commissioning of the Isaac Newton Telescope at Herstmonceux. It proved so successful that the cloudy weather was felt to be a bottleneck to its productivity, and plans were made to get it to a higher spot with better weather.

On 1 December 1967, the Isaac Newton Telescope of the Royal Greenwich Observatory at Herstmonceux was inaugurated by Queen Elizabeth II. The telescope was the biggest telescope by aperture in the British Isles. It was moved to Roque de los Muchachos Observatory in Spain's Canary Islands in 1979. In 1990 the RGO moved to Cambridge. At Herstmonceux, the castle grounds became the home of the International Study Centre of Queen's University, Kingston, Canada, and the Observatory Science Centre, which is operated by an educational charity Science Project.

The Observatory Science Centre opened in April 1995. Some of the remaining telescopes, which were left behind in the move, have public observation events as part of operations of the centre. The centre has established itself as a noted tourist and education attraction in its own right, featuring many old observatory items as exhibits. It was getting 60,000 visitors per year in the early 21st century.

=== The Royal Observatory at Cambridge ===
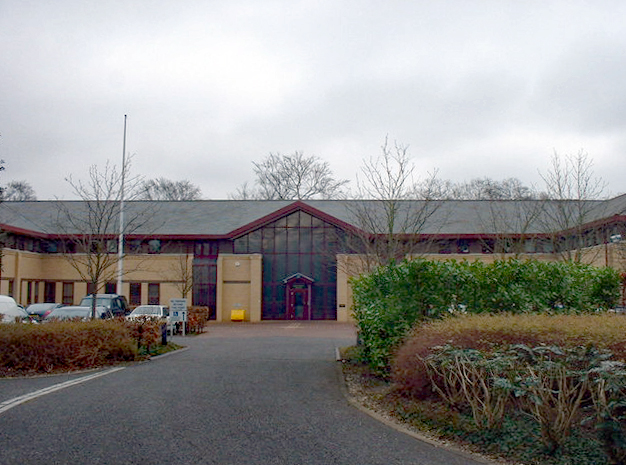
Greenwich House at Cambridge

In 1990 the Royal Observatory moved from Herstmonceux to a new site at Cambridge, adjacent to the University's Institute of Astronomy, where it occupied Greenwich House just to the north of the Cambridge Observatory. By now, the RGO's focus had moved from carrying out observations from the British Isles to providing technical support, acting as a conduit between scientists in British universities and the powerful British-owned telescopes (such as the Isaac Newton Telescope, the Anglo-Dutch Jacobus Kapteyn Telescope, and the William Herschel Telescope) on the Canary Islands and Hawaii.

After abandoning a plan to privatise the RGO and the Royal Observatory Edinburgh, the Particle Physics and Astronomy Research Council (PPARC) as the RGO's funding body made the decision to close the institution and the Cambridge site by 1998. When the RGO was closed as an institution, the HM Nautical Almanac Office transferred to the Rutherford Appleton Laboratory (Harwell Science and Innovation Campus, Chilton, Oxfordshire), while other work went to the UK Astronomy Technology Centre in Edinburgh. The old observatory site at Greenwich returned to its original name – the Royal Observatory, Greenwich – and was made part of the National Maritime Museum.

In 2002 the UK joined the European Southern Observatory, building the VISTA infrared telescope at the Paranal Observatory as an in-kind contribution.

The Astronomer Royal Martin Rees called PPARC "irresponsible" for how it handled the RGO.

=== Greenwich site returns to active use ===
In 2018 the Annie Maunder Astrographic Telescope (AMAT) was installed at the ROG in Greenwich. AMAT is a cluster of four separate instruments, to be used for astronomical research; it had achieved first light by June 2018, and contains:

- A 14-inch reflector that can take high-resolution images of the sun, moon and planets.
- An instrument dedicated to observing the sun.
- An instrument with interchangeable filters to view distant nebulae at different optical wavelengths.
- A general-purpose telescope.

The telescopes and the works at the site required to operate them cost about £150,000, from grants, museum members and patrons, and public donations.

The telescope was installed in the Altazimuth Pavilion, from which the multi-purpose telescope is controlled by a computer system.

== Magnetic observations ==
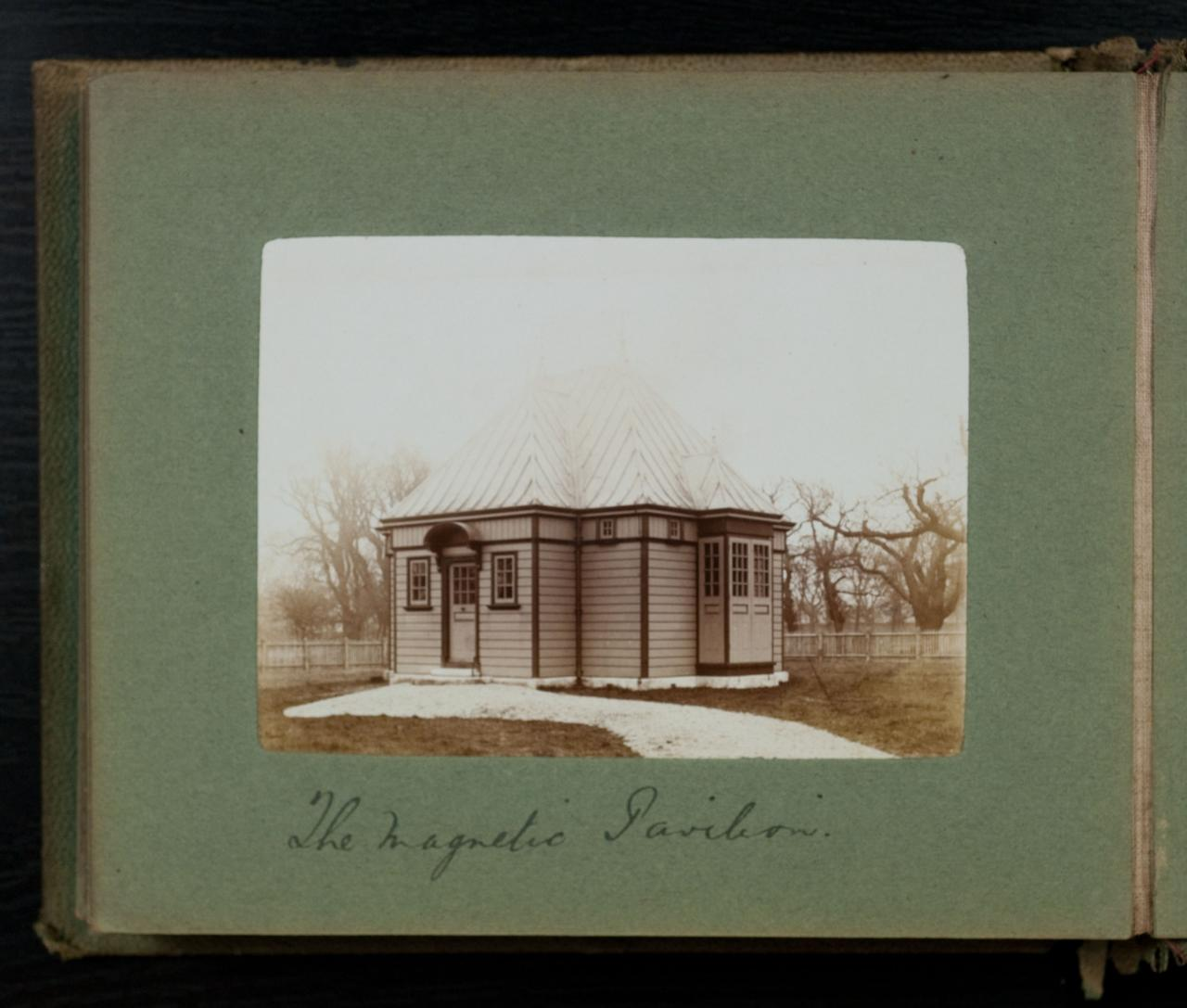
The Magnetic Pavilion, 1900

The first magnetic observation was taken in 1680 by the first Astronomer Royal, John Flamsteed, using a magnetic needle from the Royal Society. The second and third Astronomers Royal, Edmond Halley and then James Bradley, also took some magnetic measurements during their tenure.

In the 19th century George Airy established the Magnetical and Meteorological Department.

The first Magnetic House was built next to the observatory but by 1900 a second, about 300–400 metres from the main observatory, was built to reduce magnetic interference. Both houses were made of non-magnetic materials. The older building was called the Magnet House, but iron added to buildings in the 1890s at the observatory was throwing off measurements, so the instruments were moved to the Magnetic Pavilion. A new Magnetograph House was also completed by 1914.

One of the special events that occurred in the study of magnetism was when François Arago and Alexander von Humboldt took magnetic observations at Greenwich in 1822. In 1825 Arago won the Copley Gold Medal for this research (see also Arago's rotations).

== Observatory museum ==
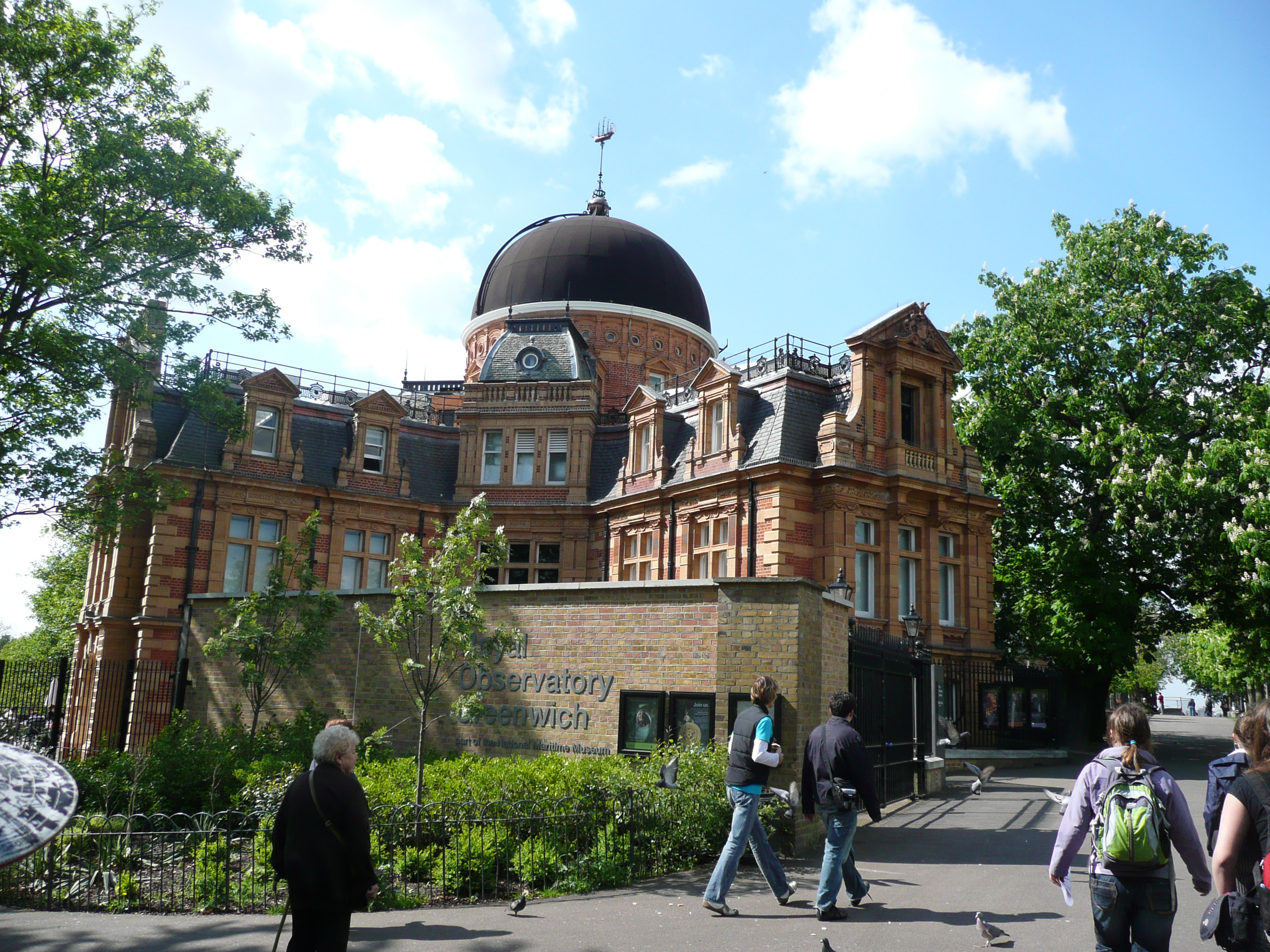
Tourists flock to the Observatory museum, 2009

The observatory buildings at Greenwich became a museum of astronomical and navigational tools, which is part of the Royal Museums Greenwich. Notable exhibits include John Harrison's pioneering chronometer, known as H4, for which he received a large reward from the Board of Longitude, and his three earlier marine timekeepers; all four are the property of the Ministry of Defence. Many additional horological artefacts are displayed, documenting the history of precision timekeeping for navigational and astronomical purposes, including the mid-20th-century Russian-made F.M. Fedchenko clock (the most accurate pendulum clock ever built in multiple copies). It also houses the astronomical instruments used to make meridian observations and the 28-inch equatorial Grubb refracting telescope of 1893, the largest of its kind in the UK. The Shepherd Clock outside the observatory gate is an early example of an electric slave clock.

In 1997 the observatory site was getting 400,000 visitors per year.

In February 2005 a £16 million redevelopment comprising a new planetarium and additional display galleries and educational facilities was started; the ROG reopened on 25 May 2007 with the new 120-seat Peter Harrison Planetarium.

For a year between 2016 and 2017 the Museum reported 2.41 million visitors.

In July 2024, the observatory announced plans for a renovation to improve access for visitors and tourists. When the site was built, it was designed primarily for scientific purposes.

== Gallery ==
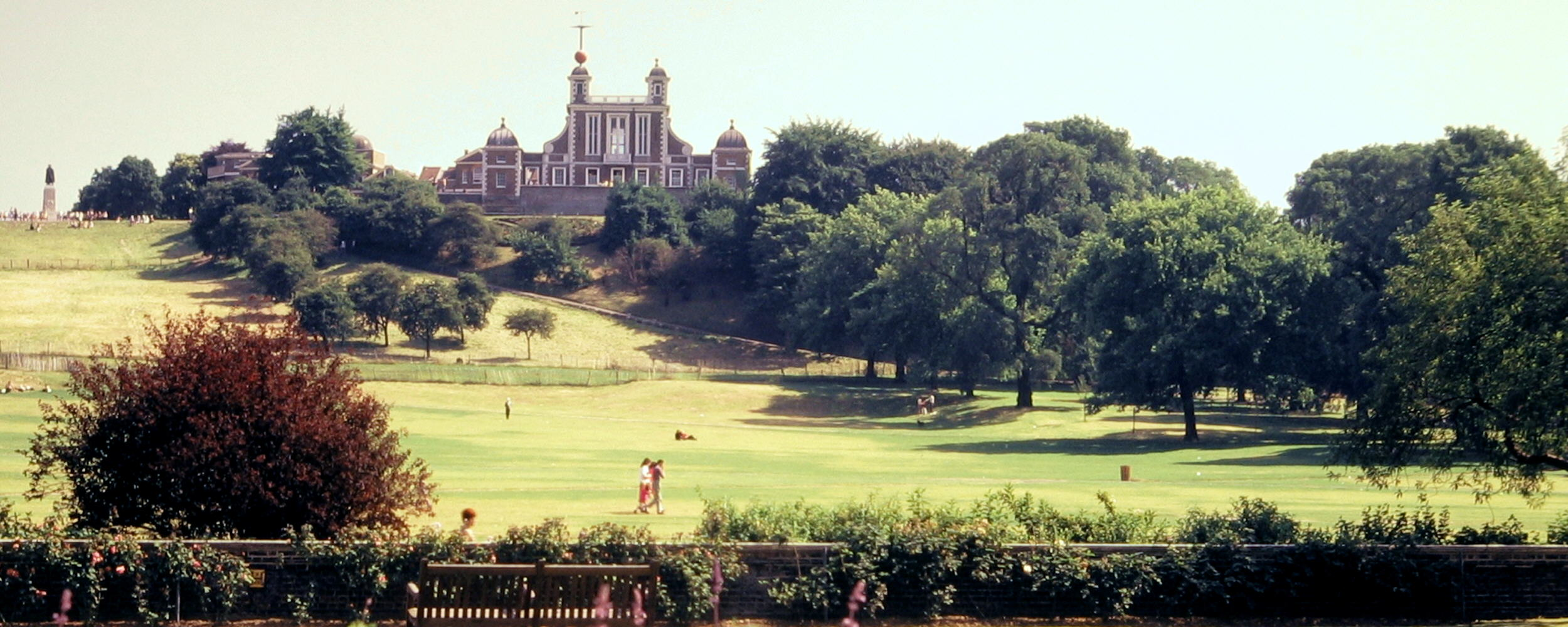
The centuries-old Flamsteed House overlooking Greenwich Park in east London, seen looking south. The statue at left is of Major General James Wolfe, who died capturing Quebec in 1759, and was buried in St Alfege Church, Greenwich.

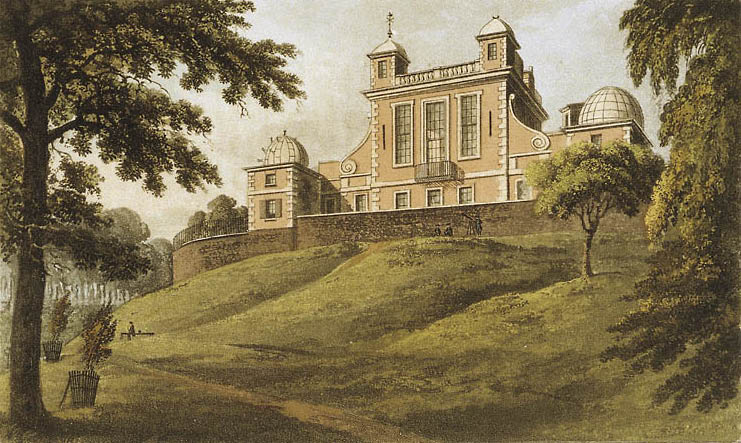
Flamsteed House in 1824

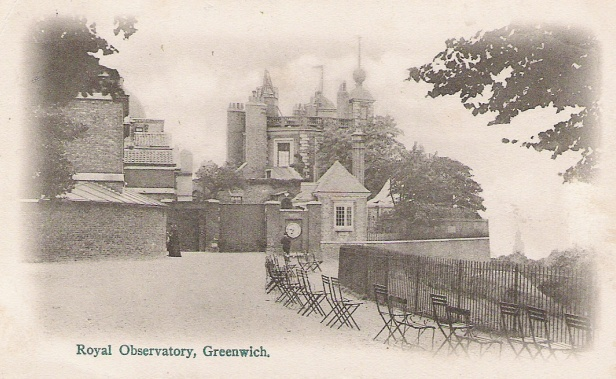
Royal Observatory, Greenwich, c. 1902, as depicted on a postcard

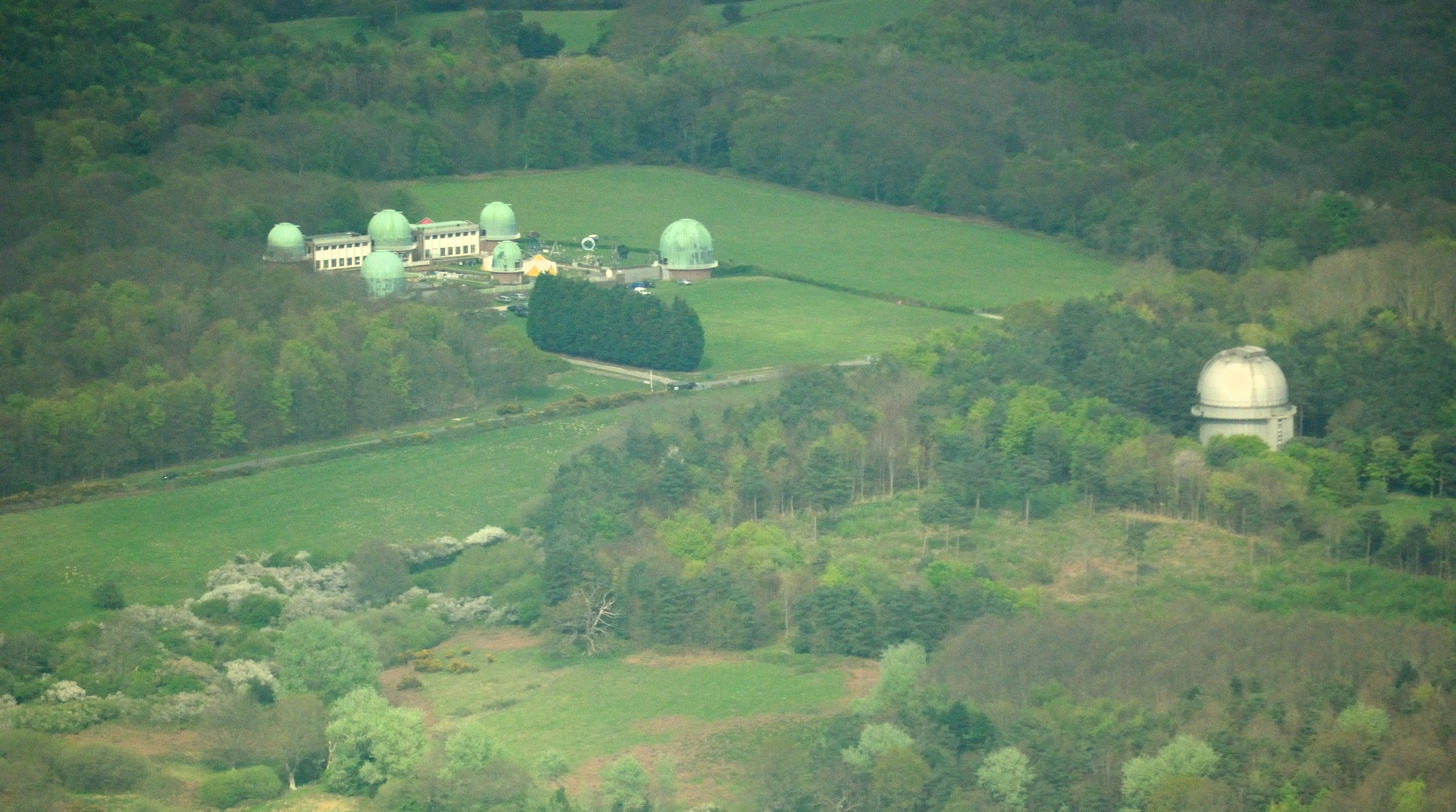
Aerial view of the Royal Greenwich Observatory, Herstmonceux site in East Sussex; the dome that formerly housed the Isaac Newton Telescope is the single dome to the right. The telescope was moved to La Palma in the Canary Isles in 1979.

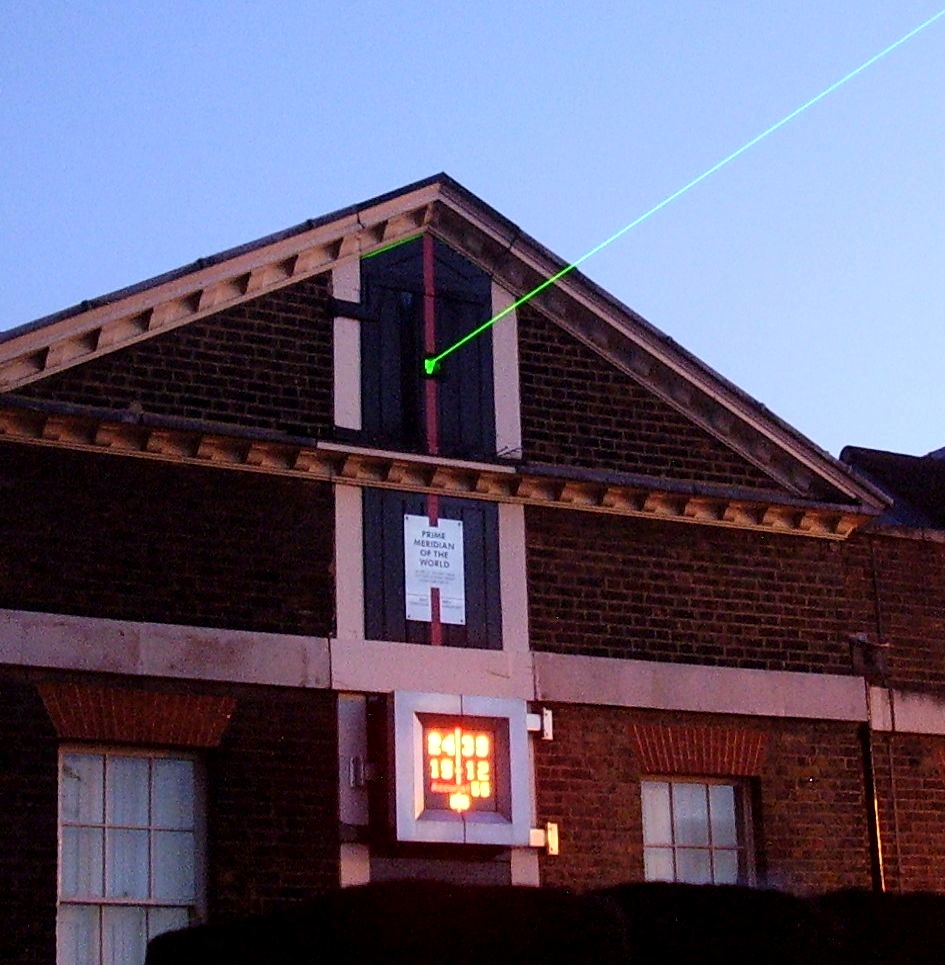
Laser projected from the observatory marking the Greenwich Prime Meridian line (1999)

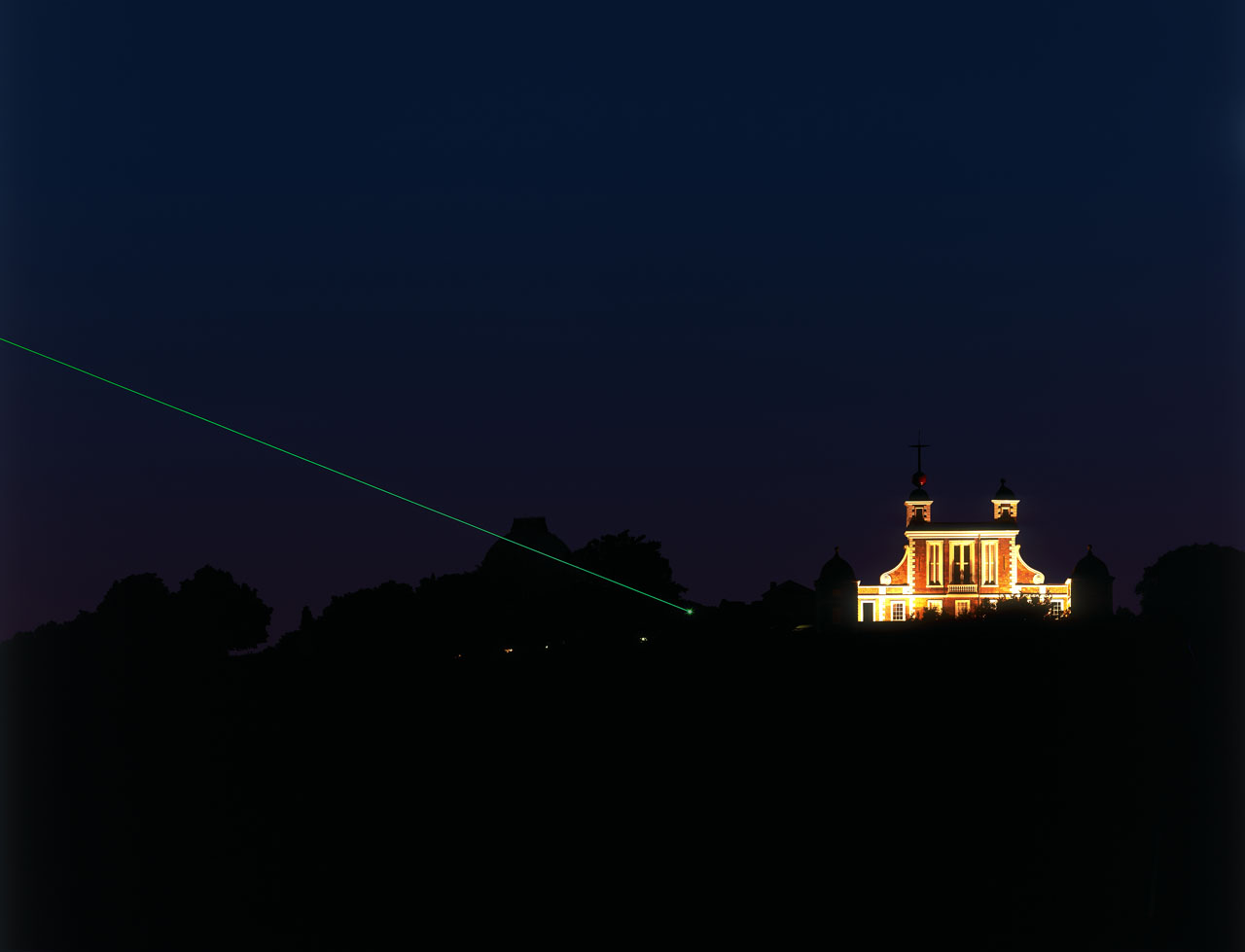
Laser at night (1999)

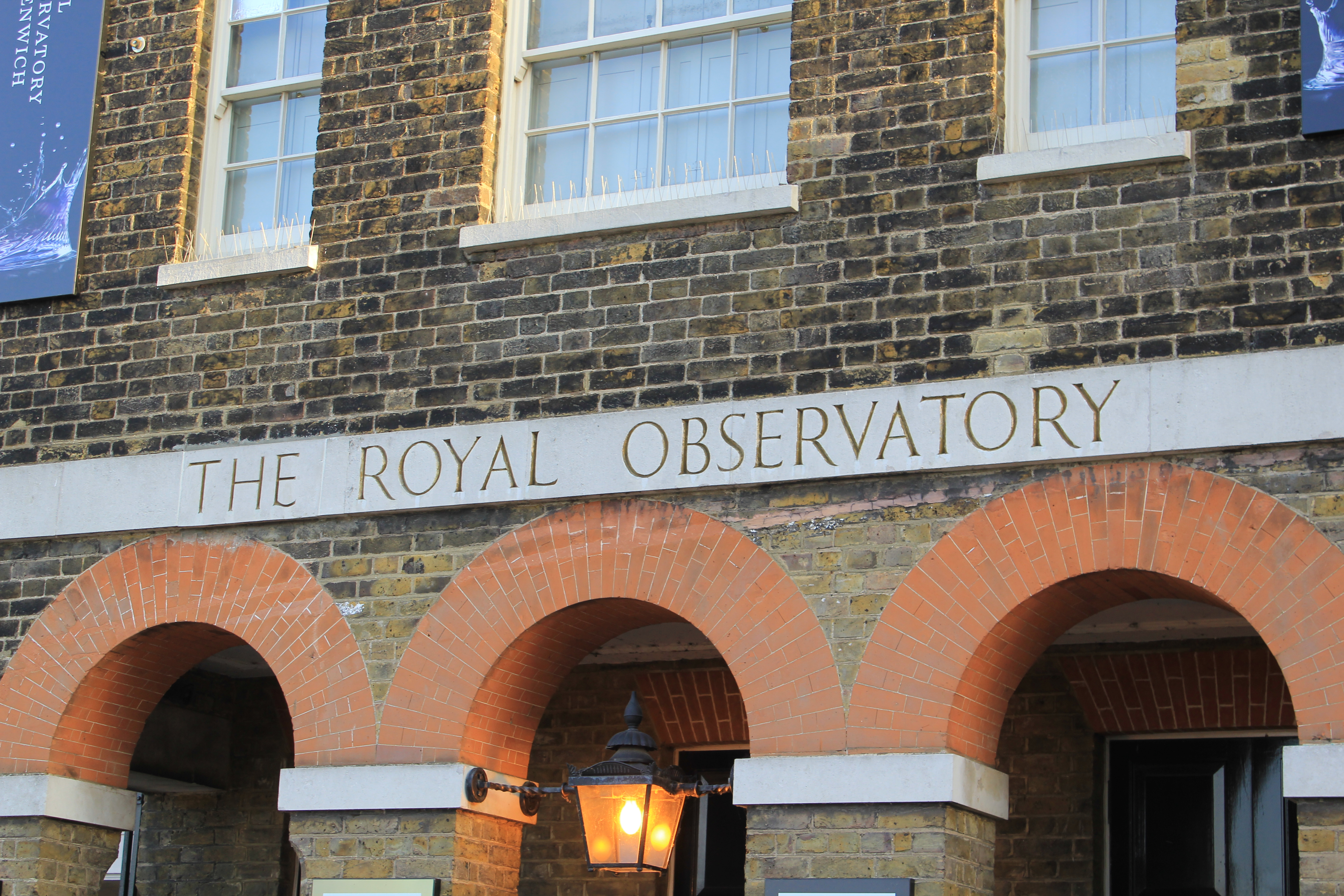
Entrance to the Great Equatorial building (2013)

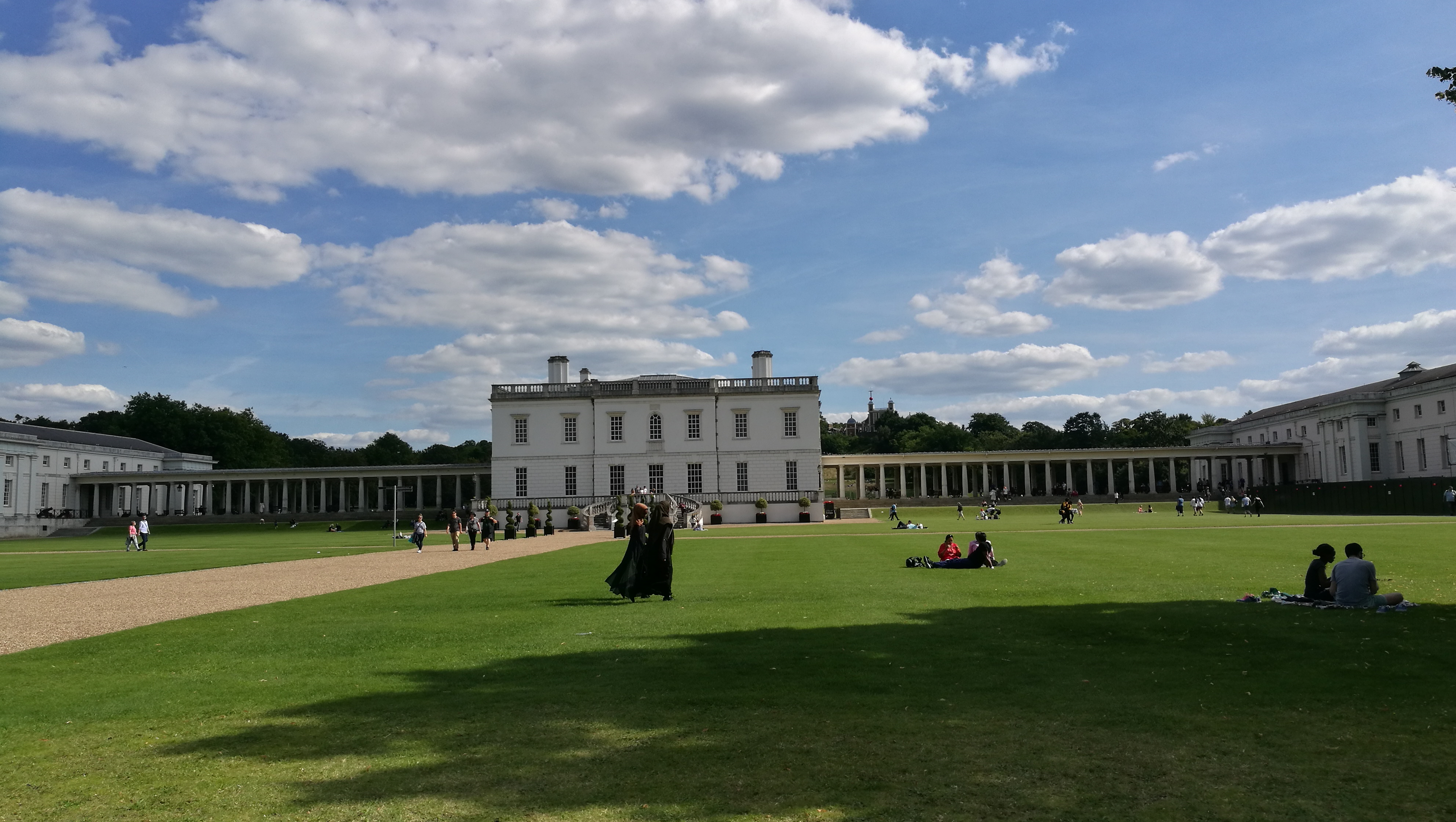
The Queen's House (centre left) at Greenwich, with the Royal Observatory on the skyline behind (2017)

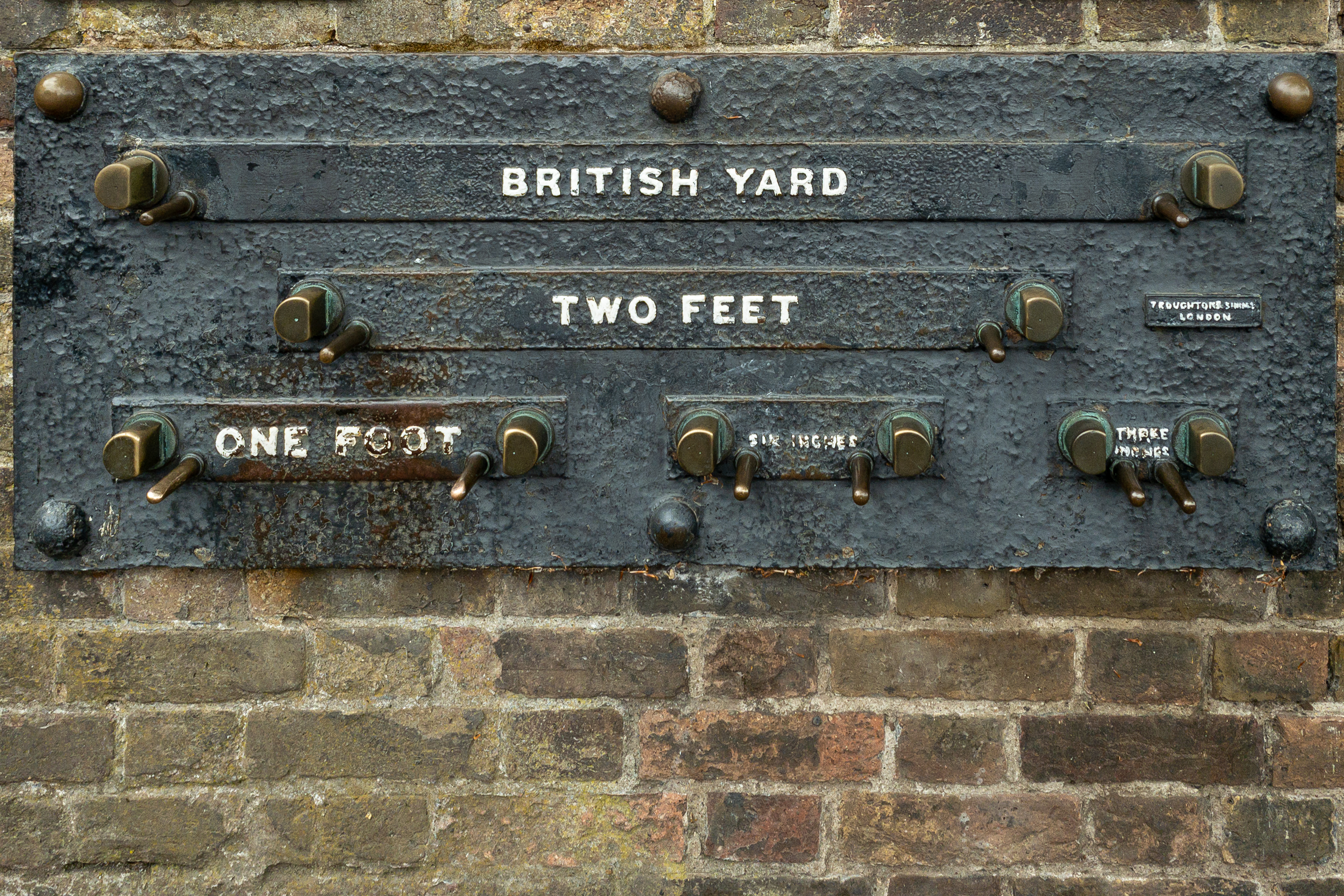
Imperial standard lengths on the wall of the Royal Observatory, Greenwich, London – 1 yard (3 feet), 2 feet, 1 foot, 6 inches (1/2-foot), and 3 inches. The separation of the inside faces of the marks is exact at an ambient temperature of 60 °F (16 °C) and a rod of the correct measure, resting on the pins, will fit snugly between them.
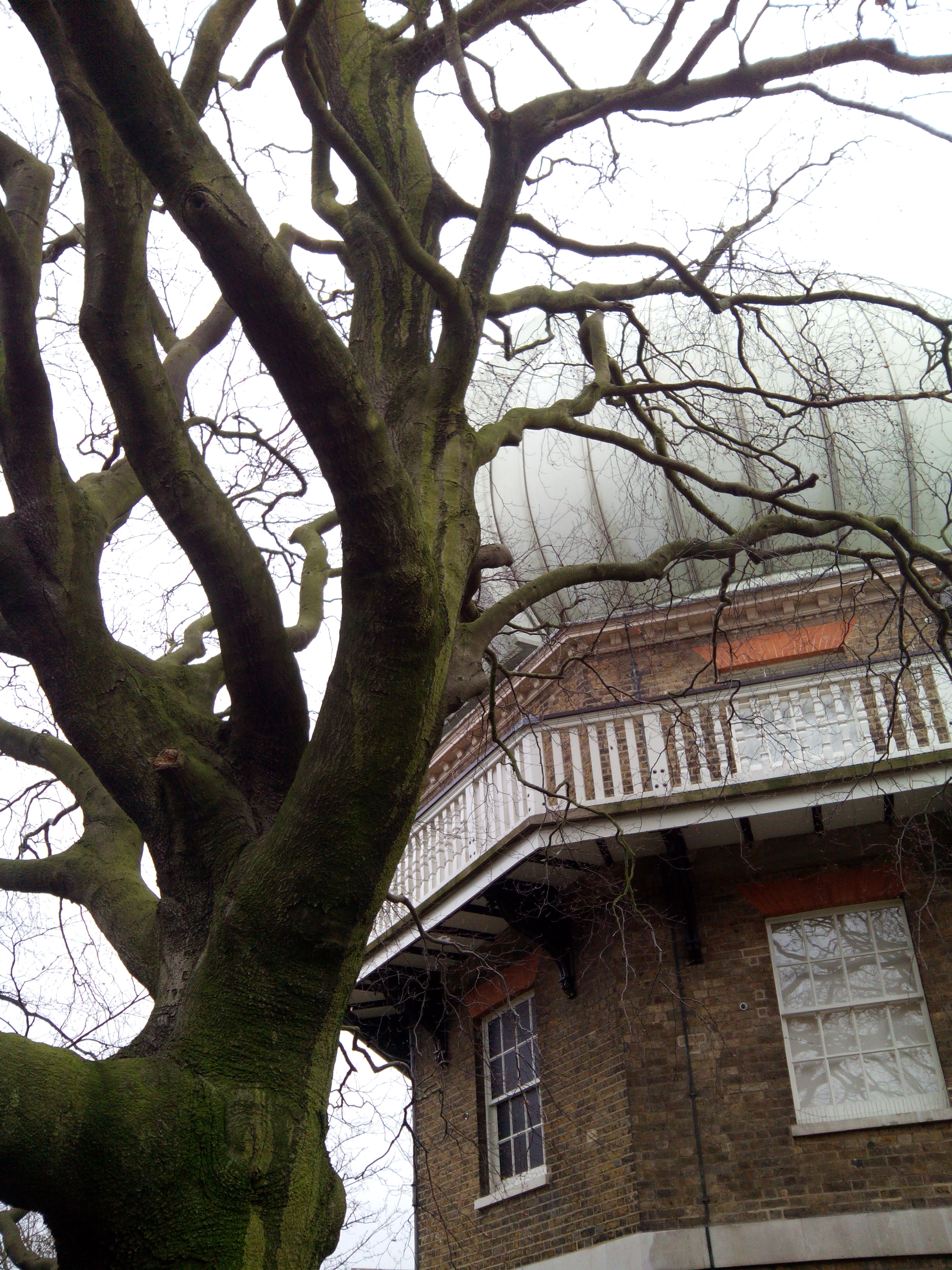
Dome of the Greenwich 28 inch refractor telescope and tree (2015)

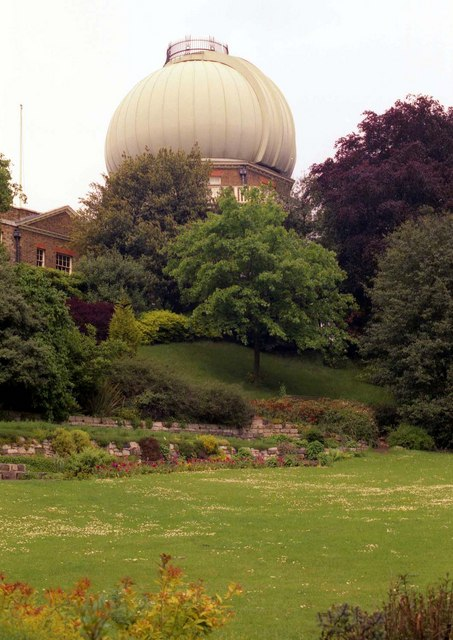
Dome of the Great Equatorial Building overlooking Greenwich Park

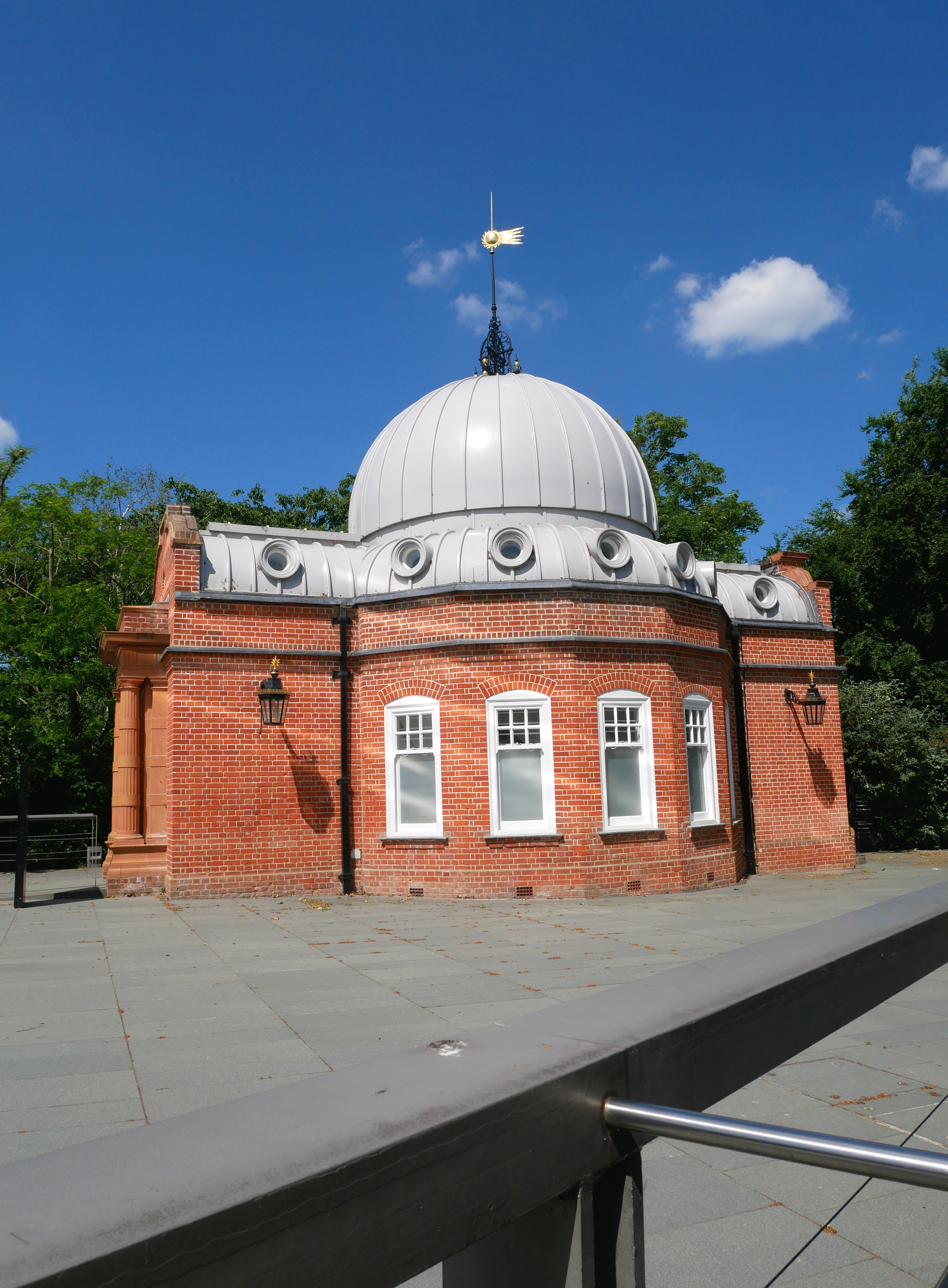
Modern view of the Altazimuth Pavilion

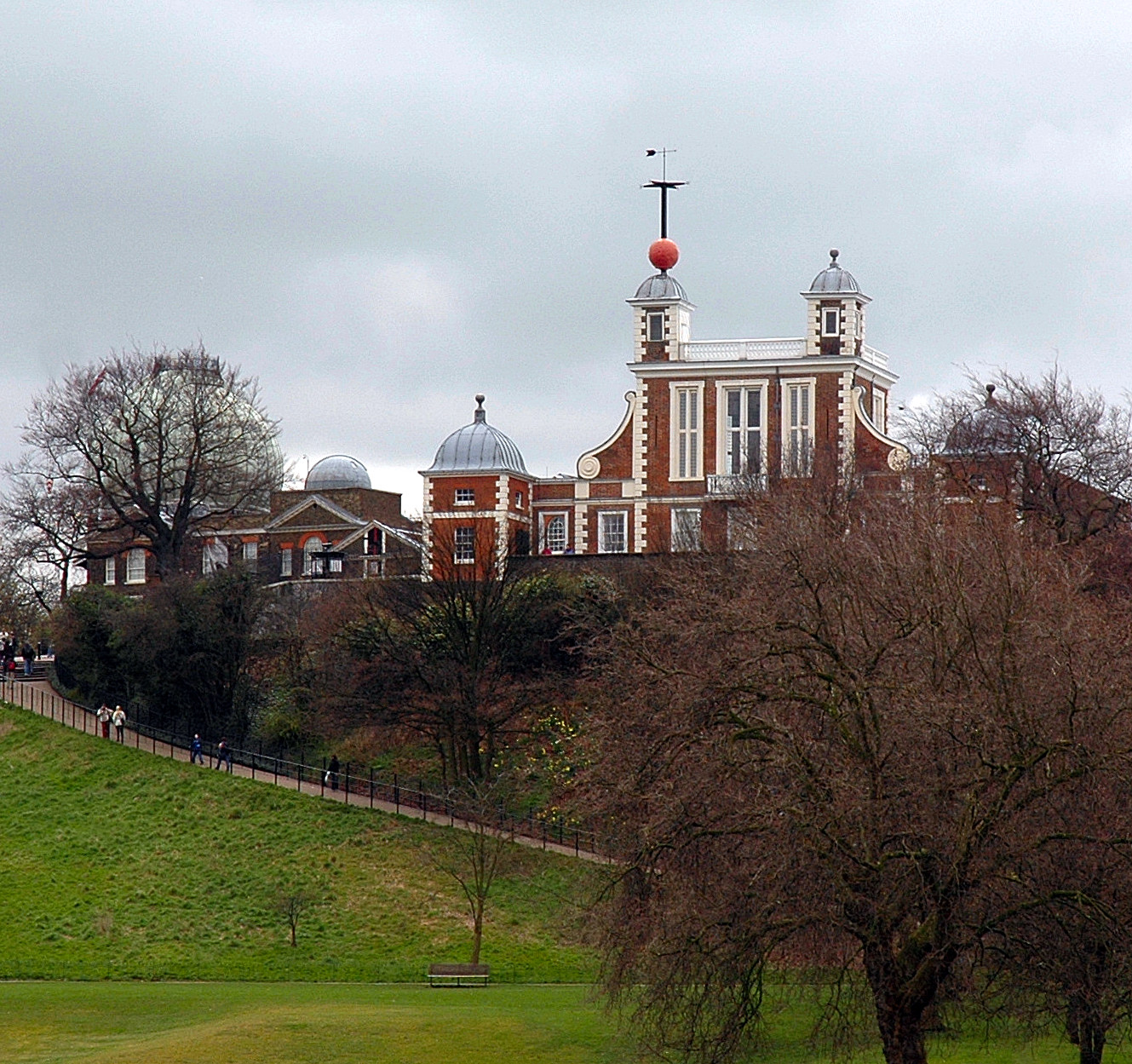
Royal Observatory, Greenwich (2006), showing its red time ball

== See also ==
- List of astronomical observatories
