= International Meridian Conference =

1884 conference in Washington, D.C., United States

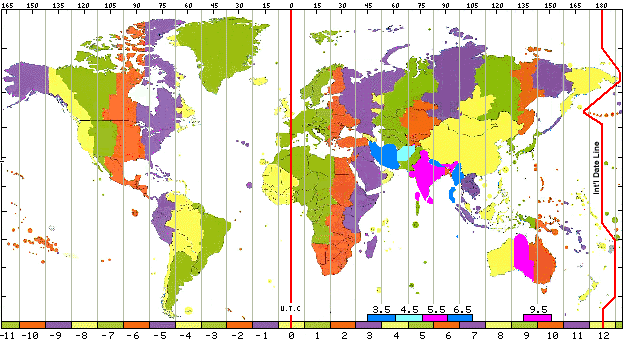
- The vertical red line left of the middle is the Greenwich meridian.
- Host country: United States
- Date: 1 October 1884
- Cities: Washington, D.C.
- Chair: C. R. P. Rodgers

Key points
- Establishment of Universal Time; Agreement of the Greenwich meridian as the international standard for 0° longitude

The International Meridian Conference was a conference held in October 1884 in Washington, D.C., in the United States, to determine a prime meridian for international use. The conference was held at the request of U.S. president Chester A. Arthur. The subject to discuss was the choice of "a meridian to be employed as a common zero of longitude and standard of time reckoning throughout the world". It resulted in the recommendation of the Greenwich Meridian as the international standard for zero degrees longitude.

== Background ==
By the 1870s there was pressure both to establish a prime meridian for worldwide navigation purposes and to unify local times for railway timetables. The first International Geographical Congress, held in Antwerp in 1871, passed a motion in favour of the use of the Greenwich Meridian for (smaller scale) passage charts, suggesting that it should become mandatory within 15 years.

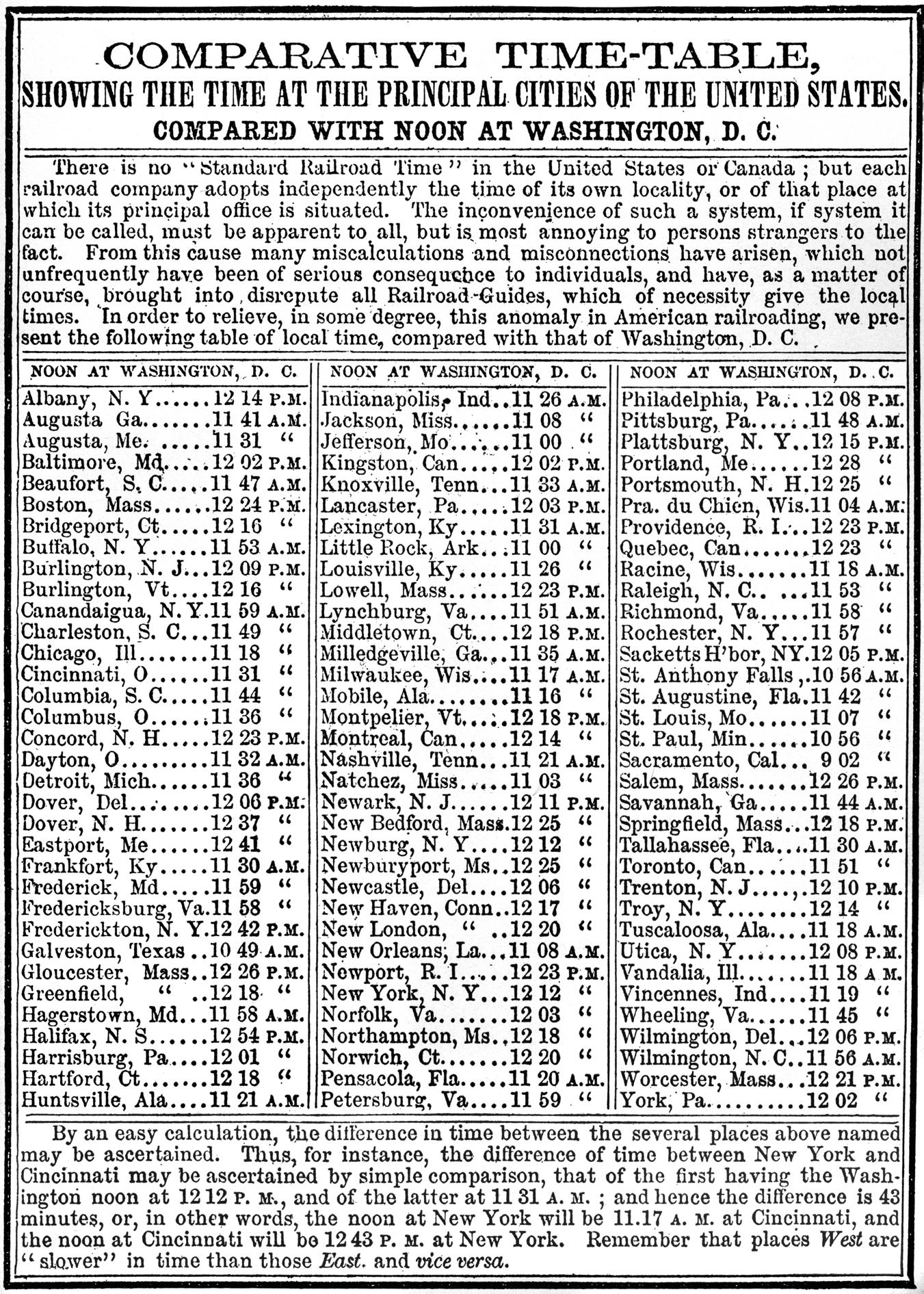
Local times in major towns across the United States, as published in 1857 when, as the document states, 'There is no "Standard Railroad Time" in the United States or Canada'

In Britain, the Great Western Railway had standardised time by 1840 and in 1847 the Railway Clearing Union decreed that "GMT be adopted at all stations as soon as the General Post Office permitted it". The Post Office was by this time transmitting time signals from Greenwich by telegraph to most parts of the country to set the clocks. By January 1848, Bradshaw's railway guide showed the unified times and met with general approval, although legal disputes meant that it was not until 1880 that GMT was formally established across the UK.

In New Zealand, the impetus for introducing a standard time was to coordinate the operating hours of telegraph offices. By the end of 1868, it was formally defined nationwide as being 11½ hours in advance of GMT, making it the first country to explicitly refer its civil time to the Greenwich Meridian.

In the United States, the problems were much more severe, with one table showing over 100 local times varying by more than 3 hours. In 1870, Charles F. Dowd published a pamphlet titled A System of national time and its application advocating three time zones across the country based on the Washington meridian, modifying this to four zones based on the Greenwich meridian in 1872.

The first proposal for a consistent treatment of time worldwide was a memoir entitled Terrestrial Time by Sandford Fleming, at the time the chief engineer of the Canadian Pacific Railway, presented to the Canadian Institute in 1876. This envisaged clocks showing 24-hour universal time with an extra dial having a local time rounded to the nearest hour. He also pointed out that many of the corrections for local mean time were greater than those involved in abandoning solar time. In 1878/79, he produced modified proposals using the Greenwich meridian. Fleming's two papers were considered so important that in June 1879 the British Government forwarded copies to eighteen foreign countries and to various scientific bodies in England. At the same time the American Metrological Society produced a "Report on Standard Time" by Cleveland Abbe, chief of the United States Weather Service proposing essentially the same scheme.

These proposals did not meet universal approval in the scientific community, being opposed by John Rodgers, Superintendent of the Naval Observatory, Washington, and British Astronomer Royal, George Airy who had both established wire services supporting local time in various cities. The Naval Observatory had also foiled the onward transmission of the Greenwich time signal from Harvard, where it was received via transatlantic cable and used to time a time ball in Boston. Nevertheless, the United States passed an Act of Congress on 3 August 1882 authorizing the President to call an international conference to fix on a common prime meridian for time and longitude throughout the world.

The International Meridian Conference had its origins in the Third International Geographical Congress held in Venice in 1881, in which the establishment of a universal prime meridian and a uniform standard of time was high on the agenda. The Seventh International Geodesic Conference in Rome in October 1883 then thrashed out most of the technical details, leaving the diplomatic agreements to a later conference.

On 11 October 1883, a convention of railroad executives met in Chicago and agreed to the implementation of five time zones in North America, using as a basis Greenwich Mean Time. Before the invitations to the Washington conference were sent out on 1 December, the joint efforts of Abbe, Fleming and William Frederick Allen, Secretary of the US railways' General Time Convention and Managing Editor of the Travellers' Official Guide to the Railways, had brought the US railway companies to an agreement which led to standard railway time being introduced at noon on 18 November 1883 across the nation. Thus, a strong sense of fait accompli preceded the Washington conference, although setting local times was not part of the remit of the conference and it was not legally established until 1918.

== Participants ==
Twenty-six countries, represented by 41 delegates, participated in the conference:

- Austria-Hungary
- Brazil
- Chile
- Colombia
- Costa Rica
- Denmark (absent)
- France
- Germany
- Guatemala
- Hawaii
- Italy
- Japan
- Liberia
- Mexico
- Netherlands
- Ottoman Empire
- Paraguay
- Russia
- Salvador
- Santo Domingo
- Spain
- Sweden–Norway
- Switzerland
- United Kingdom, included delegates from
  - British India
  - Canada
- United States
- Venezuela

== Resolutions ==
On 22 October 1884, the following resolutions were adopted by the conference (voting took place on 13 October):

1. That it is the opinion of this Congress that it is desirable to adopt a single prime meridian for all nations, in place of the multiplicity of initial meridians which now exist. (This resolution was unanimously adopted.)
2. That the Conference proposes to the Governments here represented the adoption of the meridian passing through the centre of the transit instrument at the Observatory of Greenwich as the initial meridian for longitude. (Ayes, 22; noes, 1; abstaining, 2.)
3. That from this meridian longitude shall be counted in two directions up to 180 degrees, east longitude being plus and west longitude minus. (Ayes, 14; noes, 5; abstaining, 6.)
4. That the Conference proposes the adoption of a universal day for all purposes for which it may be found convenient, and which shall not interfere with the use of local or standard time where desirable. (Ayes, 23; abstaining, 2.)
5. That this universal day is to be a mean solar day; is to begin for all the world at the moment of mean midnight of the initial meridian, coinciding with the beginning of the civil day and date of that meridian; and is to be counted from zero up to twenty-four hours. (Ayes, 14; noes, 3; abstaining, 7.)
6. That the Conference expresses the hope that as soon as may be practicable the astronomical and nautical days will be arranged everywhere to begin at midnight.
7. That the Conference expresses the hope that the technical studies designed to regulate and extend the application of the decimal system to the division of angular space and of time shall be resumed, so as to permit the extension of this application to all cases in which it presents real advantages. (Ayes, 21; abstaining, 3.)

Resolution 2, fixing the meridian at Greenwich, was passed 22–1 (San Domingo, now the Dominican Republic, voted against); France and Brazil abstained. The French did not adopt the Greenwich meridian as the beginning of the universal day until 1911. Even then it refused to use the name "Greenwich", instead using the term "Paris mean time, retarded by 9 minutes and 21 seconds". France finally replaced this phrase with "Coordinated Universal Time" (UTC) in 1978.

Resolution 4 expressly exempts standard time from the universal day. Although two delegates, including Sandford Fleming, proposed the adoption of standard time by all nations, other delegates objected, stating that it was outside the purview of the conference, so neither proposal was subjected to a vote. Thus the conference did not adopt any time zones, contrary to popular belief.

Regarding resolution 6: Great Britain had already shifted the beginning of the nautical day from noon, twelve hours before midnight, to midnight in 1805, during the Battle of Trafalgar. The astronomical day was shifted from noon, twelve hours after midnight, to midnight effective 1 January 1925 by a resolution of the newly formed International Astronomical Union.

On 13 October 1884, the following resolution was not adopted:

1. That the initial meridian should have a character of absolute neutrality. It should be chosen exclusively so as to secure to science and to international commerce all possible advantages, and especially should cut no great continent—neither Europe nor America. (Ayes, 3; noes, 21.)

Twenty-one countries voted against the proposal, while three (France, Brazil, San Domingo) voted in favor.

== Delegates ==
From the Act of the Conference the Delegates were:

Name	Designation	on behalf of ...
Present
Baron Ignatz von Schäffer	Envoy Extraordinary and Minister Plenipotentiary	Austria-Hungary
Luís Cruls	Director of the Imperial Observatory of Rio de Janeiro	Brazil
Commodore S. R. Franklin	U.S. Navy, Superintendent U.S. Naval Observatory	Colombia
Juan Francisco Echeverria	Civil Engineer	Costa Rica
A. Lefaivre	Minister Plenipotentiary and Consul-General	France
Pierre Janssen	Director of the Physical Observatory of Paris	France
Baron H. von Alvensleben	Envoy Extraordinary and Minister Plenipotentiary	German Empire
Captain Sir F. J. O. Evans	Royal Navy	Great Britain
J. C. Adams	Director of the Cambridge Observatory	Great Britain
Lieut.-General Richard Strachey	Member of the Council of India	Great Britain
Sandford Fleming	Representative from the Dominion of Canada	Great Britain
M. Miles Rock	President of the Boundary Commission	Guatemala
Hon. W. D. Alexander	Surveyor-General	Hawaii
Hon. Luther Aholo	Privy Counsellor	Hawaii
Count Alberto De Foresta	First Secretary of Legation	Italy
Professor Kikuchi Dairoku	Dean of the Scientific Department of the University of Tokyo	Japan
Leandro Fernandez	Civil Engineer	Mexico
Angel Anguiano	Director of the National Observatory of Mexico	Mexico
Captain John Stewart	Counsul-General	Paraguay
C. de Struve	Envoy Extraordinary and Minister Plenipotentiary	Russia
Major-General Stebnitzki	Imperial Russian Staff	Russia
J. de Kologrivoff	Conseiller d'État actuel	Russia
M. de J. Galvan	Envoy extraordinary and Minister Plenipotentiary	San Domingo
Antonio Batres	Envoy extraordinary and Minister Plenipotentiary	Salvador
Juan Valera	Envoy Extraordinary and Minister Plenipotentiary	Spain
Emilio Ruiz del Arbol	Naval Attaché to the Spanish Legation	Spain
Juan Pastorin	Officer of the Navy	Spain
Count Carl Lewenhaupt	Envoy Extraordinary and Minister Plenipotentiary	Sweden
Colonel Emil Frey	Envoy Extraordinary and Minister Plenipotentiary	Switzerland
Rear-Admiral C. R. P. Rodgers	U.S. Navy	United States
Lewis Morris Rutherfurd		United States
W. F. Allen	Secretary Railway Time Conventions	United States
Commander W. T. Sampson	U.S. Navy	United States
Professor Cleveland Abbe	U.S. Signal Office	United States
Señor A. M. Soteldo	Chargé d'Affaires	Venezuela
Not present on the first day of the conference but arrived later
Francisco Vidal Gormaz	Director of the Hydrographic Office	Chile
Alavaro Bianchi Tupper	Assistant Director	Chile
Carl Steen Andersen de Bille	Minister Resident and Consul-General	Denmark
Hinckeldeyn	Attaché of the German Legation	Germany
William Coppinger	Consul-General	Liberia
Wilhelm de Weckherlin	Envoy Extraordinary and Minister Plenipotentiary	Netherlands
Ahmet Rüstem Bey	Secretary of Legation	Ottoman Empire

== Outcomes ==
The main issue at the conference, apart from procedural issues such as the provision of an authorized French translation of the proceedings, was France's insistence that the meridian should have a strictly neutral character in the same way that they maintained that the metre was a neutral measure. This requirement conflicted with the need to base measurements on an established observatory on land and Fleming's proposal of using the anti-meridian of Greenwich was not supported by the British delegation. In the end, the pragmatic argument for continuity with most nautical charts won the day and the French delegation abstained in the vote.

On the question of universal time, Fleming's opinion to one of the lead-up committees was borne out: "In my judgment, the nearest approach to it which may be attempted with any chance of success, is to have first, a primary standard time, based on the prime meridian that is to be used for non-local purposes; second, to have twenty-four secondary standard times to govern local reckoning." There was discussion of setting zones as small as 10 minutes (i.e. 10 minutes of time; 2½° or 150 arcminutes of longitude), but no motion was tabled, as there was little experience to guide the choice.

Most European countries aligned their clocks with Greenwich within ten years, Sweden and North America already having done so, and the trend continued. The French maintained Paris time till 1911 and the following year convened a second conference to address the differences between different observatories which had become apparent, leading to the establishment of the Bureau International de l'Heure after World War I.

== Bibliography ==
- Howse, Derek (1980). Greenwich Time and the discovery of the longitude. Oxford Univ Press. ISBN 978-0-19-215948-9.
- Howse, Derek (1997). Greenwich Time and the Longitude. Phillip Wilson. ISBN 0-85667-468-0.
