= United Kingdom Ordnance Survey Zero Meridian =

Prime meridian used by the OSGB36 reference system

The United Kingdom Ordnance Survey Zero Meridian is the prime meridian used by the Ordnance Survey (OSGB36 datum). It is about six metres to the west of the Airy meridian marked at Greenwich. When the first Ordnance Survey map was published in 1801, the official Prime Meridian of Great Britain was the one established by the third Astronomer Royal, James Bradley. When Airy's new Prime Meridian ("new" by virtue of Sir George Airy's instrument being placed in a room next to that housing James Bradley's instrument) superseded it fifty years later in 1851, the Ordnance Survey simply continued to use Bradley's.
