= Britannia Triumphant =

Proposed monumental statue in Greenwich, London

Coordinates: 51.4777°N 0.0007°W

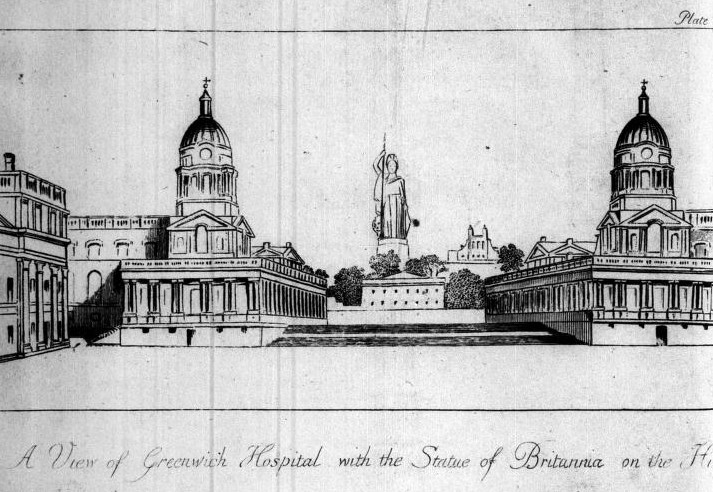
A View of Greenwich Hospital with the Statue of Britannia on the Hill, a sketch by William Blake included in Flaxman's "letter to the committee for raising the naval pillar, or monument". It shows what the statue would have looked like from the Thames, framed as intended by the domes of the Greenwich Hospital.

Britannia Triumphant full title Britannia by Divine Providence Triumphant or the Statue of Britannia was a proposed but unrealised 230 ft (70 m) tall statue of Britannia, with spear and shield, to be built atop Greenwich Hill as a monument to the British victory at the Battle of the Nile.

== Proposition ==
The statue was proposed by John Flaxman in 1799 as a grand structure that would be visible from London and to ships sailing up the Thames Estuary, one of the most significant arteries of British and world commerce at the time. It was devised as an entry to the Naval Pillar or Monument scheme which had been created in order to memorialise the Battle of the Nile.

The site of Greenwich Hill, possibly suggested by Flaxman's former master George Dance the Younger, was chosen as to frame the statue with Wren's Royal Naval College, as well as providing something of a pedestal for the statue to gain yet greater prospect. The somewhat smaller Statue of James Wolfe was erected in a similar position in 1930.

== Response ==
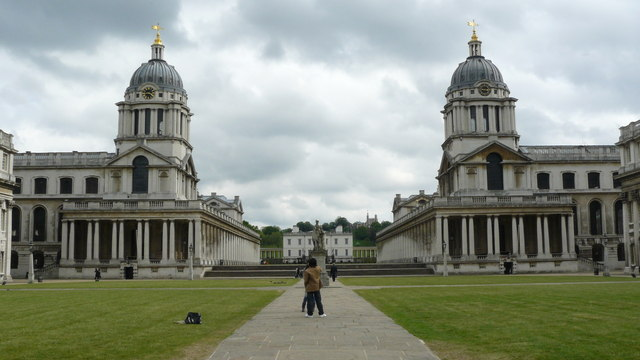
The same view roughly as it is seen today.

At a height of 230ft the immense scale of the proposal would make it generally unpopular as it was considered excessively conspicuous and out of scale with its surroundings. What interest there was waned following the resumption of the Napoleonic Wars in 1803. Flaxman was himself aware of the limited possibility of his proposal being successful, a number of sketches from before the 1799 letter would show more reserved designs.

Nevertheless, the statue became the subject of satire, Turner quipping "There is to be a show at Greenwich of little Flaxman and big Britannia". The statue would however be brought up in the following decades when the possibility of a grand commemorative scheme was proposed and at least briefly reconsidered after the First World War.

A model of the proposal was displayed at the Royal Academy Exhibition of 1801 and now sits in Sir John Soane's Museum's collection.
