= Edward Wolfe =

British Army officer

Lieutenant-General Edward Wolfe
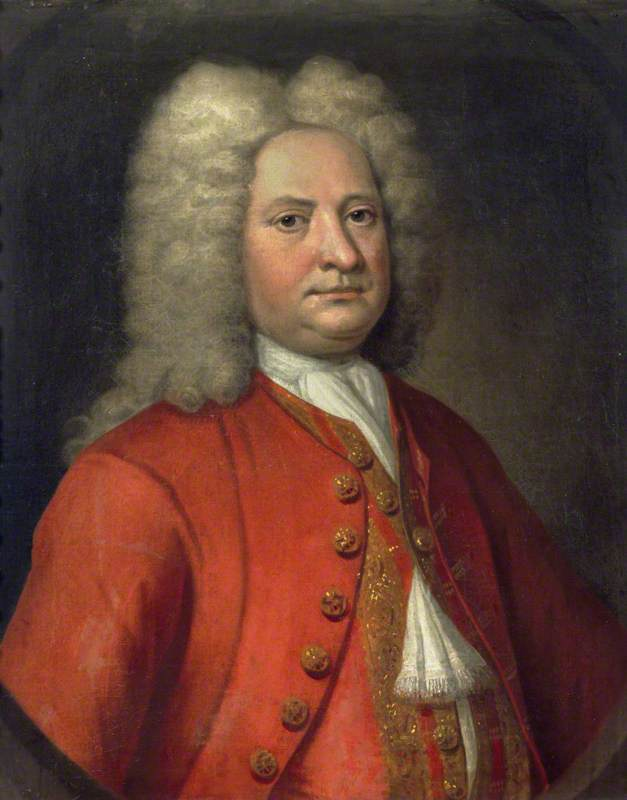
- Oil on canvas portrait by Sir James Thornhill, c. 1730
- Born: 1685; York, England
- Died: 26 March 1759 (aged 73–74); Blackheath, England
- Children: James Wolfe
- Military career
- Allegiance: Kingdom of Great Britain
- Branch: British Army
- Service years: 1700–1759
- Rank: Lieutenant-General
- Commands: 1st Marine Regiment; 8th (The King's) Regiment of Foot

Lieutenant-General Edward Wolfe (1685 – 26 March 1759) was a British Army officer who saw action in the War of the Spanish Succession, 1715 Jacobite rebellion and the War of Jenkins' Ear. He is best known as the father of James Wolfe, famous for his capture of Quebec in 1759.

== Early life ==
Wolfe was born in 1685 in York. The family had moved to England from Ireland and was of Catholic ethnoreligious descent. They later converted to Protestantism.

Wolfe acquired a commission as a lieutenant in 1700, rising quickly to captain in 1705 and becoming a brigade major during the Flanders Campaign of the Duke of Marlborough. In 1715 he served with General Wade in the Scottish Highlands, suppressing the Jacobite-supporting clans who had recently risen in rebellion.

The Treaty of Utrecht brought a long period of peace to Europe, limiting the opportunities for active service. In 1726, at All Saints' Church, Long Marston, he married Henrietta Thompson, the sister of MP Edward Thompson. In 1727 she gave birth to James Wolfe. Because of Edward's profession, James was immersed in military matters from a very young age. The family lived at Westerham in Kent, at what is now Quebec House, but moved to Greenwich in 1738 to be closer to London.

== Cartagena ==
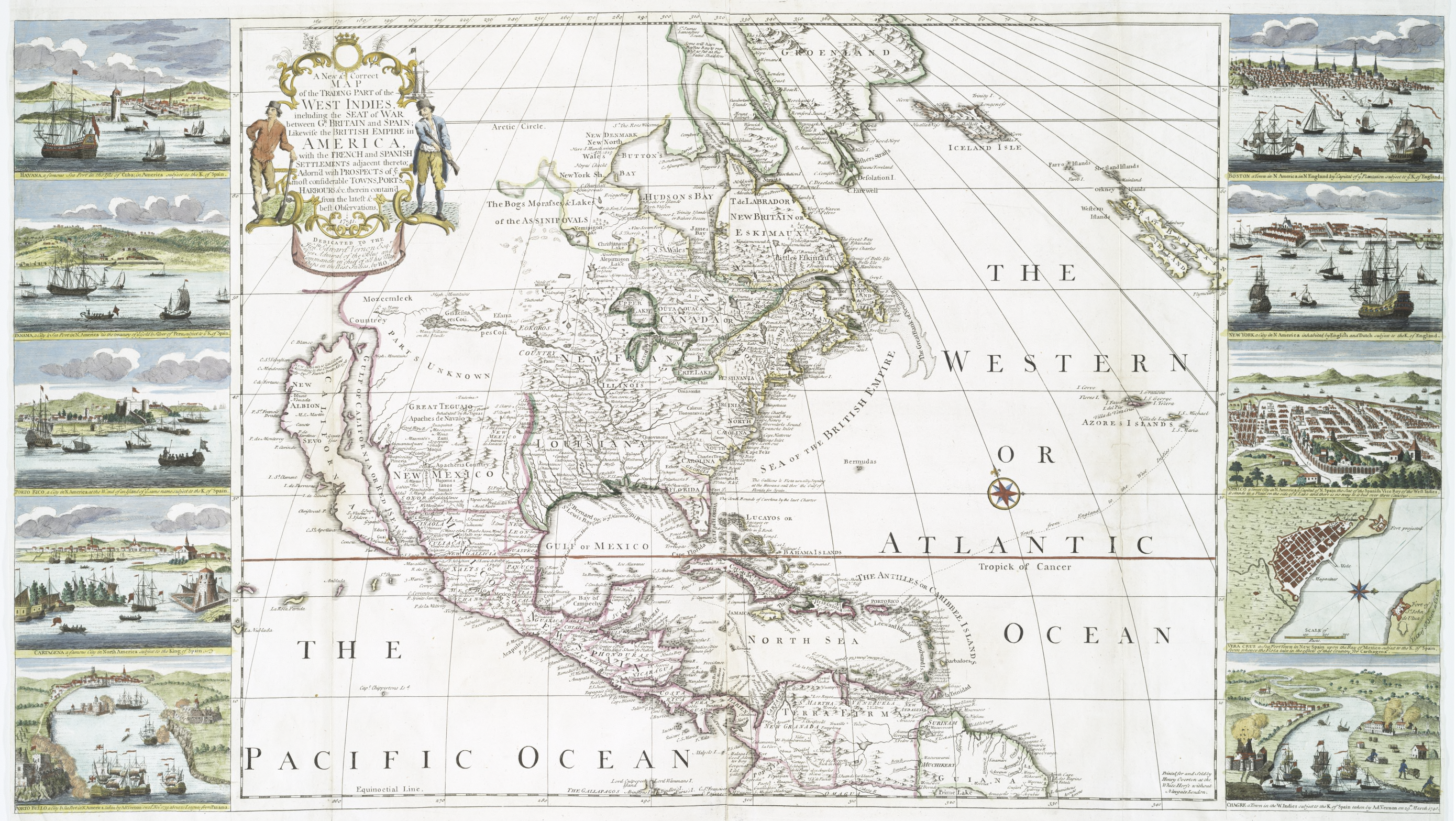
A Map of the trading part of the West Indies, created 1741 in honour of Vernon showing Boca Chica, Cartagena - 2nd from the bottom left

In 1739 with war with Spain looming, Wolfe prepared to return to active service. The declaration of the War of Jenkins' Ear triggered an expansion of the British military, with several new regiments of marines being created. Wolfe was promoted to Colonel and appointed to command one of the new regiments.

A major expedition was planned to sail for the Caribbean under Lord Cathcart to follow up the British victory at Porto Bello. In 1740 Wolfe and his travelled down to Portsmouth and then on to the Isle of Wight where the expedition was being assembled, bringing his son with him as a volunteer. James Wolfe hoped to take part in the expedition, gaining valuable experience of soldiering. However, he fell badly ill and had to return home to Greenwich. Although James had felt humiliated, it had probably saved his life.

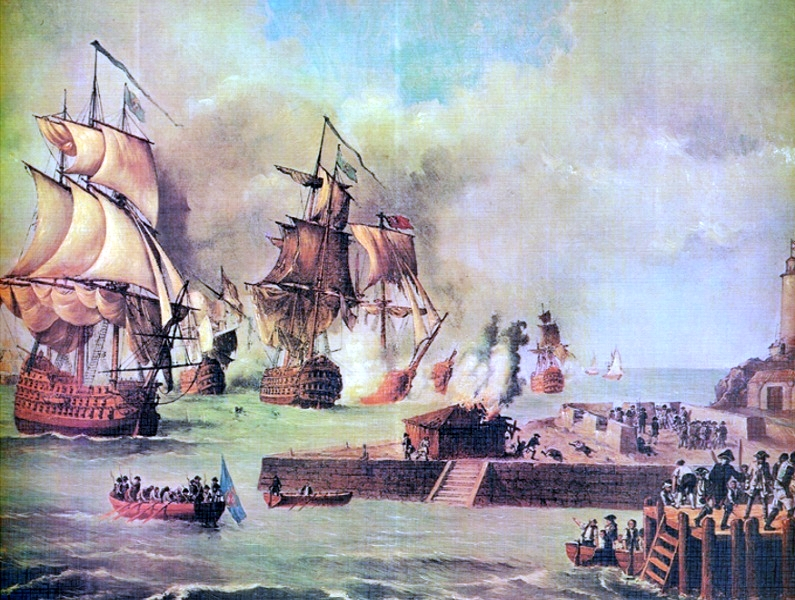
The British assault Cartagena

Edward Wolfe and his regiment took part in the expedition, which soon dissolved into a disaster. The British had decided to seize the port of Cartagena in South America, which was used to ship precious metals. However the British attacked during the rainy season and suffered around 18,000 casualties - almost entirely from disease. Abandoning the attack of Cartagena they then decided to attempt to capture Santiago in Cuba, only to be frustrated there as well. The expedition then returned home.

== Later career ==
Wolfe had been lucky to survive the Cartagena disaster, in which many of his comrades had died. He was made Colonel of the 8th (The King's) Regiment of Foot in 1745 and promoted to the rank of Lieutenant General in 1747.

He had been too infirm to be considered for active service on the continent, once the War of the Austrian Succession broke out. However, when the Jacobite rising broke out in 1745 Wolfe was sent to Berwick to command of a detachment of troops. As the Jacobites advanced into England using a different route he was not called into action.

== Death ==
Edward Wolfe died on 26 March 1759 at the age of 74, while his son was crossing the Atlantic Ocean to assault French forces in Canada. During the campaign at Quebec, James Wolfe wore a black armband in mourning for his father. His own death while leading his troops to victory on the Plains of Abraham meant that father and son had both died in the "Year of Victories".

== Bibliography ==
- Brumwell, Stephen. Paths of Glory: The Life and Death of General James Wolfe. Continuum Books, 2006.
- McLynn, Frank. 1759: The Year Britain Became Master of the World. Pimlico, 2005.

Military offices
New title Regiment raised	Colonel of the 1st Marine Regiment; 1739–1745	Succeeded by George Keightley
Preceded by Richard Onslow	Colonel of the 8th (The King's) Regiment of Foot; 1745–1759	Succeeded by John Barrington
