= Macartney House =

Historic house in Greenwich, London

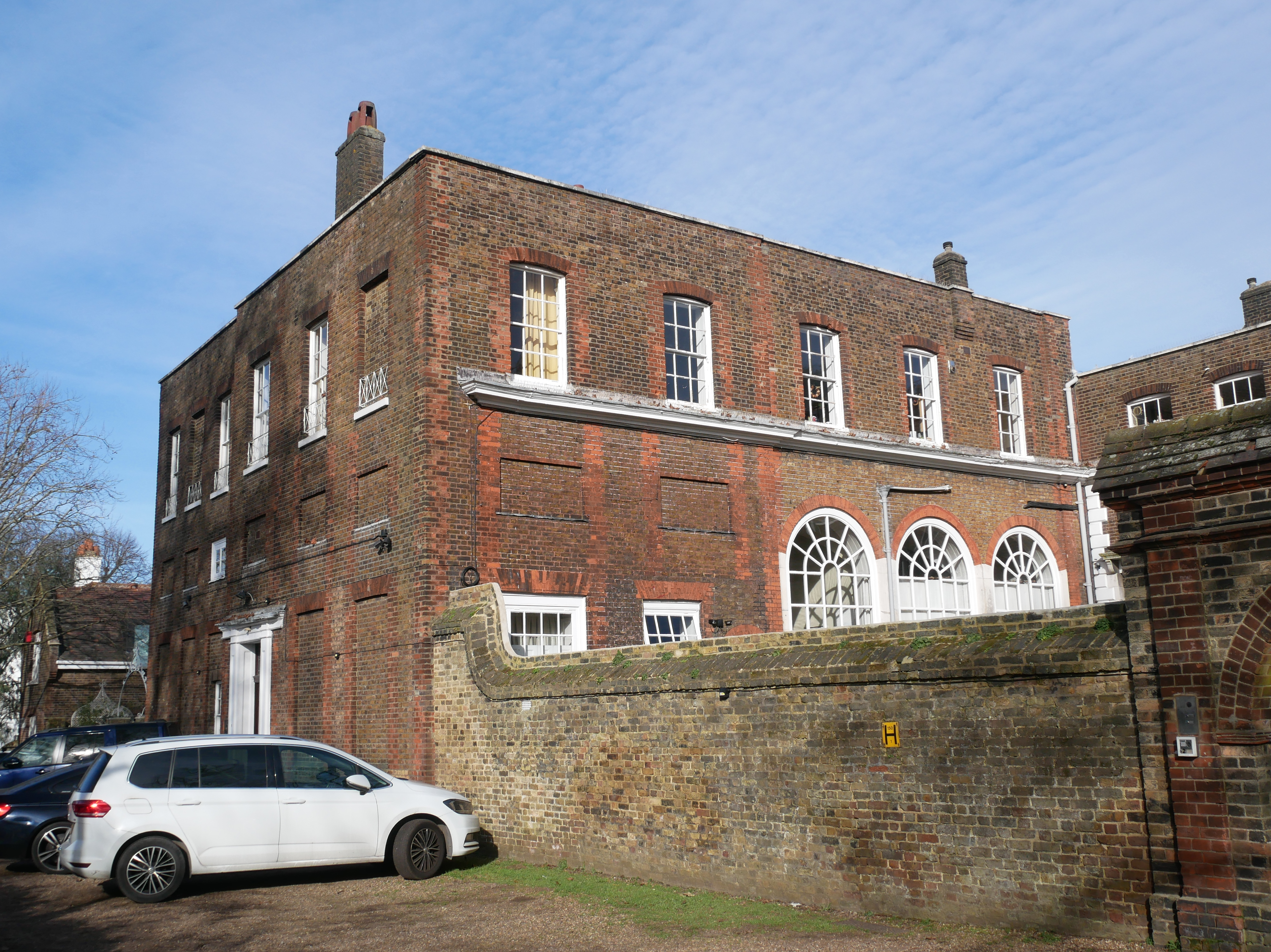
- Interactive map of the Macartney House area

General information
- Type: Residential
- Location: Greenwich, London England
- Coordinates: 51°28′30″N 0°00′12″W
- Completed: 1694

Listed Building – Grade II
- Official name: Macartney House
- Designated: 19 October 1951
- Reference no.: 1079069

Macartney House is a Grade II listed house in Chesterfield Walk, Greenwich, London.

The house was built around 1694 although has since had a number of extra additions and extensions. Among them are some added by Sir John Soane who also remodelled the interior in 1802 under the ownership of George Lyttelton. The north wing was added around 1855 and a few further extensions were added in the following decades. The building was split into flats in 1925.

There is a blue plaque commemorating General James Wolfe, who died leading the British to victory at the Battle of the Plains of Abraham. He was taken to lie in state here after his death. A statue of him was given by the people of Canada and stands nearby in Greenwich Park.
