= How Stands the Glass Around =

English folk song

The melody of How Stands the Glass Around

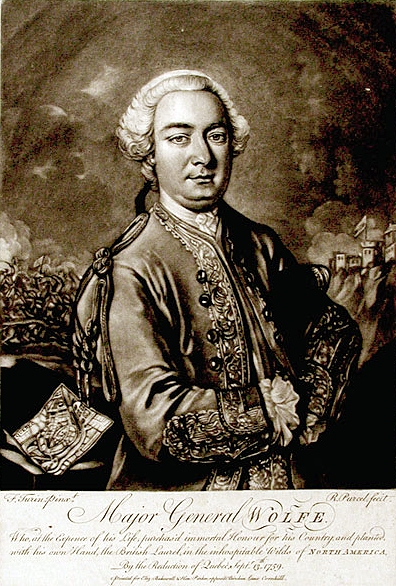
James Wolfe, posthumous portrait

"How Stands the Glass Around", also referred to as "General Wolfe's Song", is an English folk song. The lyrics express the suffering of soldiers, wherefore the song was primarily popular among people serving in the military. It deals with the helplessness experienced during war and the boldness demanded in the military, but also about reducing fear and pain by consuming alcohol. One paper suggests that it was the favourite song of Alexander Hamilton.

== Background ==
The oldest known reference to the song is an alternative text written for a ballad opera in 1729. It became notorious after Wolfe was reported to have sung it before the Battle of the Plains of Abraham (1759), gaining thereby the alternative title of "General Wolfe's Song".

== Lyrics ==
How stands the glass around
For shame, ye take no care, me boys
How stands the glass around
Let mirth and wine abound
The trumpets sound
The colours, they are flying, boys
To fight, kill or wound
May we still be found
Content with our hard fare, me boys
On the cold ground

Why, soldiers, why
Should we be melancholy, boys
Why, soldiers, why
Whose business ’tis to die
What sighing fie
Damn fear, drink on, be jolly boys
’Tis he, you and I
Cold, hot, wet or dry
We’re always bound to follow, boys
And scorn to fly

’Tis but in vain
I mean not to upbraid you, boys
’Tis but in vain
For soldiers to complain
Should next campaign
Send us to Him that made us, boys
We’re free from pain
But should we remain
A bottle and kind landlady
Cures all again

== Melody ==
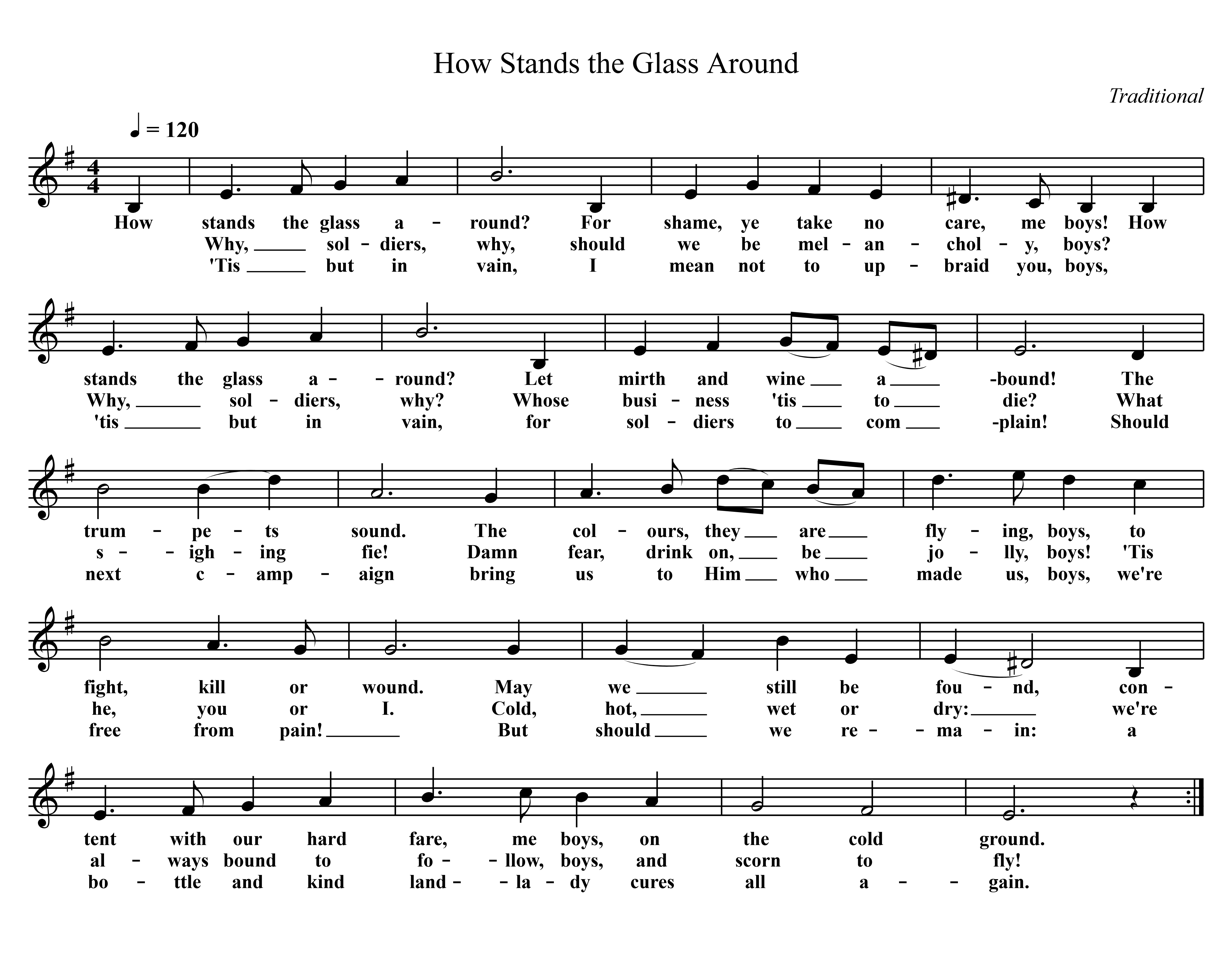

== Further use ==
- The composer William Shield made use of the song for his opera Siege of Gibraltar (1780).
- The sonata Siege of Quebec by William de Krifft begins with the melody of How Stands the Glass Around.
- The band Wilderun conceived a metal arrangement of How Stands the Glass Around.

== Trivia ==
- Alexander Graydon quotes the song in his memoirs.

== Recordings ==
- Townley, John. "How Stands the Glass Around". YouTube.
- Walker, Ben. "How Stands the Glass Around". YouTube.
