= Quebec House =

Grade I listed military museum in the United Kingdom

Coordinates: 51.267160°N 0.075900°E

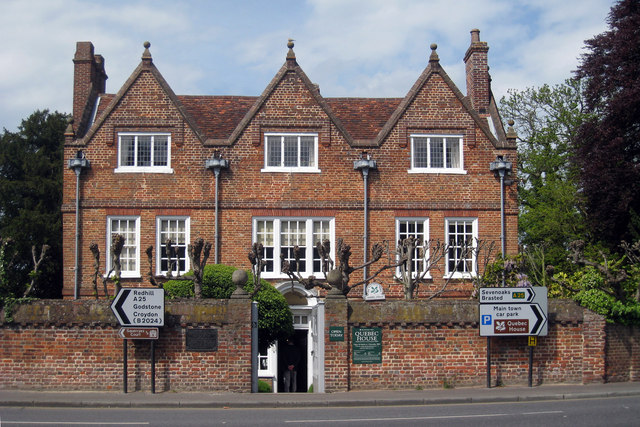
Quebec House

Quebec House is the birthplace of General James Wolfe on what is now known as Quebec Square in Westerham, Kent, England. The house is listed Grade I on the National Heritage List for England since September 1954.

The house dates from the mid 16th century but much of the current appearance is from the 1630s. It was originally called Spiers but renamed in honour of Wolfe's death and victory at the Battle of Quebec in 1759. The house is now owned by the National Trust and open to the public with paintings and memorabilia relating to Wolfe's life.

== History ==
Originally called Spiers, the house was built between 1530 and 1550 as a timber-framed L-shaped building. It was altered in the 1630s, when the current exterior was added.

James Wolfe was the son of a distinguished general, Edward Wolfe who rented Spiers. Wolfe lived there from 1728 until 1738.

The house was renamed after his victory at the Battle of Quebec. It was occupied in 1911 by Canadian author Henry Beckles Willson and his family. Joseph Bowles Learmont of Montreal acquired the house and presented it to the National Trust in 1917.

== Architecture and contents ==
The square brick building has two storeys and an attic with a tiled pitched roof. The three-bay front has three equal gables. There is a water pump by the back door which dates from 1792. A blue plaque along the outer brick wall marks the entrance of the Wolfe's home.

Various pictures relating to the life of General Wolfe are displayed in the house. The purchase of two portraits was assisted by the Art Fund.

The house is surrounded by a garden stocked with plants which would have been available in the 18th century. The coach house has been converted into a tea room and bookshop with an exhibition on the battle and on Wolfe's life. The house itself contains memorabilia and paintings connected to him.
