= Statue of James Wolfe =

Statue in London, England

Coordinates: 51.4778°N 0.0008°W

General James Wolfe
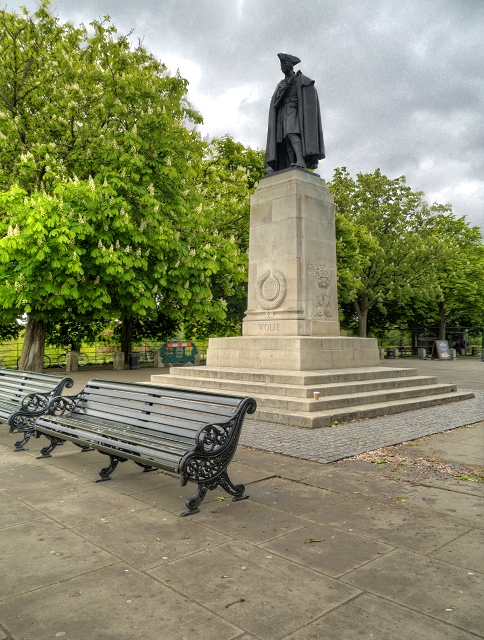
- Artist: R. Tait McKenzie
- Completion date: 1930
- Subject: James Wolfe
- Location: London

Listed Building – Grade II
- Official name: Statue of General Wolfe, to East of Royal Observatory
- Designated: 8 June 1973
- Reference no.: 1358977

The statue of James Wolfe is a bronze statue of James Wolfe to the east of Greenwich Observatory which has been Grade II listed since June 1973.

Wolfe is most commonly known for his capture of Quebec in the Battle of the Plains of Abraham, where he died in battle in 1759. It has been said that shortly before his death he quoted Gray's Elegy "The paths of glory lead but to the grave". The significance of the battle and Wolfe's death during it painted him as a hero in the public consciousness. The statue's site is close to Macartney House, where Wolfe lived for some time, and St Alfege Church where he is buried.

The statue was given as a gift by the Canadian people, and is a work of the Canadian sculptor R. Tait McKenzie. It was unveiled in 1930 by the Marquis de Montcalm, a descendant of the opposing general whom Wolfe had faced at the Plains of Abraham. It stands at the top of Greenwich Hill, overlooking the Old Royal Naval College and much of London beyond. The site was part of a proposal of 1799 by John Flaxman to build a grand 230 ft–tall monumental statue dedicated to Britain's victory at the Battle of the Nile.
