= View of Greenwich and the Queen's House =

Painting by Hendrick Danckerts

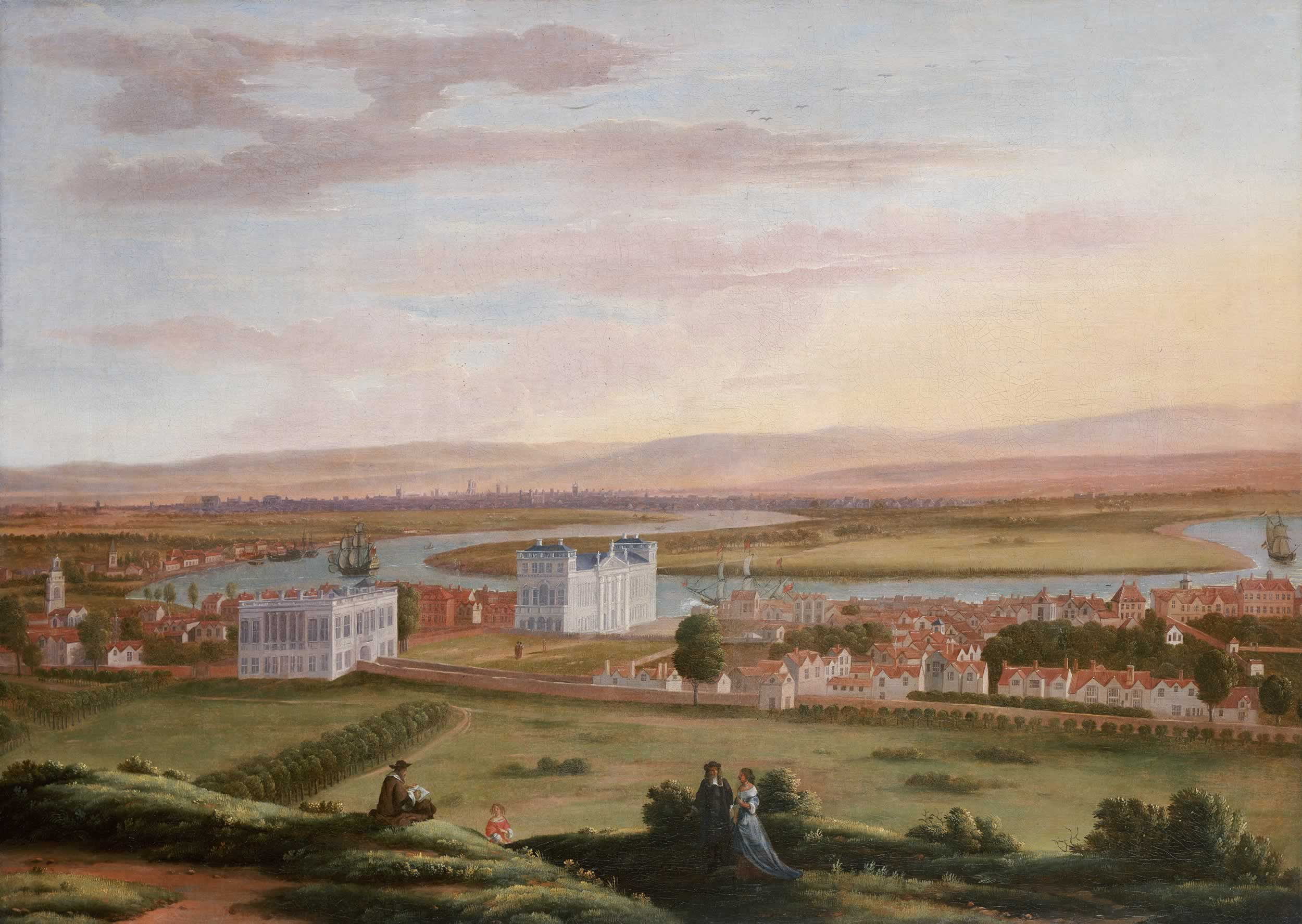
- Artist: Hendrick Danckerts
- Year: c. 1670
- Type: Oil on canvas, landscape painting
- Dimensions: 86.5 cm × 121 cm (34.1 in × 48 in)
- Location: National Maritime Museum, London

View of Greenwich and the Queen's House from the South-East is an oil on canvas landscape painting by the Dutch artist Hendrick Danckerts, from c. 1670. It features a view looking north west from Greenwich Hill across Greenwich Palace and the town of Greenwich towards the River Thames, with the City of London visible in the distance. The old Woolwich Road runs through the middle of the Queen's House while to the right of the building is the new Christopher Wren-designed King's House which later became part of Greenwich Hospital. The London skyline is noticeable for featuring evidence of the Great Fire of 1666, including the ruins of Old St Paul's Cathedral which would soon be replaced by New St Paul's by Wren.

Danckerts was a Dutch Golden Age artist who settled in England during the Restoration era. Samuel Pepys commissioned four paintings from Danckerts featuring the royal residences of Greenwich, Hampton Court, Whitehall Palace and Windsor Castle. Figures included in the painting are believed to be Pepys and his wife and a self-portrait of Danckerts sketching. Today the picture is part of the collection of the National Maritime Museum in Greenwich. In 1809 the English artist J.M.W. Turner produced his own London from Greenwich Park which features a similar view, updated to the Regency era.

== Bibliography ==
- Robinson, Alan. Imagining London, 1770-1900. Springer, 2004.
- Wiles, Margaret. The Curious World of Samuel Pepys and John Evelyn. Yale University Press, 2017.
