= Old Royal Naval College =

World Heritage Site in London, England

Maritime Greenwich
UNESCO World Heritage Site
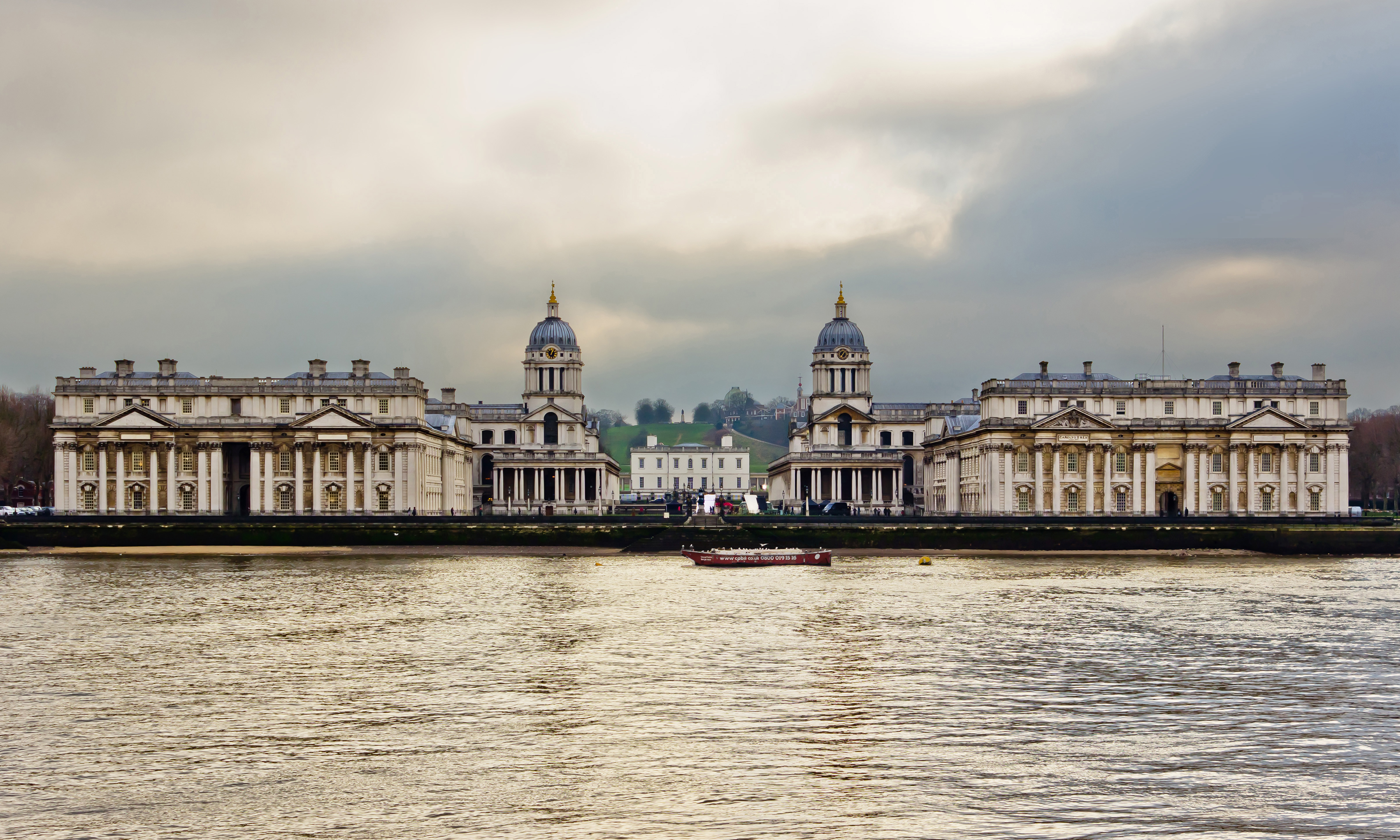
- The Chapel is in Queen Mary Court (left) and the Painted Hall is in King William Court (right). The domes are above the entrances. The Queen's House is in the centre distance.

- Location within the United Kingdom
- Location: London Borough of Greenwich, England
- Includes: Old Royal Naval College; Greenwich Hospital, London; Royal Naval College, Greenwich
- Criteria: Cultural: (i), (ii), (iv), (vi)
- Reference: 795
- Inscription: 1995 (19th Session)
- Extensions: 2008
- Area: 109.5 hectares (271 acres)
- Buffer zone: 174.85 hectares (432.1 acres)
- Website: whc.unesco.org/en/list/795/
- Coordinates: 51°29′1″N 0°0′21″W

The Old Royal Naval College are buildings that serve as the architectural centrepiece of Maritime Greenwich, a World Heritage Site in Greenwich, London on the River Thames. Described by the United Nations Educational, Scientific and Cultural Organization (UNESCO) as being of "outstanding universal value", the site is considered to be the "finest and most dramatically sited architectural and landscape ensemble in the British Isles".

Formerly the site of a royal palace, the old college was originally constructed to serve as the Royal Navy's Greenwich Hospital, designed by Christopher Wren, and built between 1696 and 1712. The hospital closed in 1869 and so between 1873 and 1998 the buildings were used as a training establishment for the Royal Naval College, Greenwich. Wren incorporated the older Queen's House into the layout design, particularly in maintaining the long axial view for the House to the river. The site is now managed by the Greenwich Foundation for the Old Royal Naval College, established in 1997 to conserve the buildings and grounds and convert them into a cultural destination.

== Origins of the site ==
This was originally the site of Bella Court, built by Humphrey, Duke of Gloucester, and subsequently renamed Palace of Placentia by Queen Margaret upon its confiscation by the Crown in the 15th century. Rebuilt by Henry VII, it was thenceforth more commonly known as Greenwich Palace. As such, it was the birthplace of Tudor monarchs Henry VIII, Mary I, and Elizabeth I, and reputedly the favourite palace of Henry VIII. The palace fell into disrepair during the English Civil War. With the exception of a then incomplete John Webb building, the palace was finally demolished in 1694, with the Webb building being completed and converted to use by the hospital.

== Greenwich Hospital ==
In 1692 the Royal Hospital for Seamen at Greenwich was created on the site on the instructions of Mary II, who had been inspired by the sight of wounded sailors returning from the Battle of La Hogue. Initially, the hospital remodeled a wing of the unfinished Greenwich Palace, and then expanded and remade the design. Architectural highlights included the Chapel and the Painted Hall. The Painted Hall was painted between 1707 and 1726 by Sir James Thornhill. The hospital closed in 1869 and the remains of thousands of sailors and officers were removed from the hospital site in 1875 and reinterred in East Greenwich Pleasaunce or "Pleasaunce Park".

== Royal Naval College, Greenwich ==
In 1873, four years after the hospital closed, the buildings were converted to a training establishment for the Royal Navy. The Royal Navy left the college in 1998 when the site passed into the hands of the Greenwich Foundation for the Old Royal Naval College.

== Greenwich Foundation for the Old Royal Naval College ==
Since 1998, the site has had a mix of new uses and activities and a revival of the historic old site under the management and control of the Greenwich Foundation. The buildings are Grade I listed. In 1999 some parts of Queen Mary and King William, and the whole of Queen Anne and the Dreadnought Building were leased for 150 years by the University of Greenwich. In 2001 Trinity College of Music leased the major part of King Charles.

In 2002, the Foundation realised its aim of opening up the whole site to visitors. It opened the Painted Hall, the chapel and the grounds and a visitor centre to the public daily, free of charge, with guided tours available. The Old Royal Naval College became open to students and visitors of all ages and nationalities. As Nathaniel Hawthorne wrote in 1863, "the people are sooner or later the legitimate inheritors of whatever beauty kings and queens create".

In 2005, the room where Nelson's coffin was held prior to his being laid-in-state was opened as the Nelson Room. The little side room contains a statue of Nelson replicating the one in Trafalgar Square, memorabilia, paintings and information. It can be seen on one of the guided tours that also include a visit to the undercrofts, the old skittle alley and crypt. A service is held in the chapel every Sunday at 11 am which is open to all. Public concerts are held here and a variety of business and cultural events are held in the Painted Hall. The area is used by visitors, students, local people and film crews in a traffic-free environment that provides coffee shops, bars and restaurants, all incorporated within the old buildings, as part of an "ancient and modern" blend that support 21st century life in Greenwich.

Trinity College of Music have provided musicians and ensembles on a subsidised commercial basis to play at events throughout East London and beyond, part of their business and community "out-reach" policy encouraged and part-funded by the Higher Education Funding Council.

The site has been used for filming television programmes, television advertisements, and feature films. Productions have included The Bounty, where captain William Bligh portrayed by Anthony Hopkins is brought in a Chariot at the start of the film, and judged during subsequent scenes. Patriot Games, where an attack on a fictional royal family member, Lord Holmes, was filmed, as well as Shanghai Knights, and a 2006 television advertisement campaign for the British food and clothing retailer Marks & Spencer. Other films include Four Weddings and a Funeral, The Madness of King George, The Mummy Returns, The Avengers (1998), Lara Croft: Tomb Raider (2001), and Guy Ritchie's Revolver (2005).

More recent filming has included BBC television's spy-drama Spooks and the dramatisation of Little Dorrit, David Cronenberg's film Eastern Promises, the film adaptation of Philip Pullman's novel Northern Lights and The Wolf Man (2009). The grounds were used extensively during the filming of 2006's Amazing Grace, and 2011's Sherlock Holmes: A Game of Shadows, Now You See Me 2 and Pirates of the Caribbean: On Stranger Tides. Scenes were shot at the grounds for The King's Speech, where the site doubled for Buckingham Palace, and The Dark Knight Rises, where it doubled for a cafe in the film's final scenes. In April 2012 the site was used for the iconic barricade scenes in the film adaption of the musical Les Miserables. In October 2012 the college was used for filming Thor: The Dark World. In October 2013 the college was used as a set for The Man from U.N.C.L.E.. The college was a filming location for the first two seasons of the Netflix series The Diplomat (2023–present).

== Painted Hall project ==
In 2014, the Old Royal Naval College announced that it was embarking on the next stage of its ambitious plans to restore the Painted Hall. Over three years, 3,700 square metres (40,000 sq ft) of Thornhill's masterpiece was to be conserved. The conservation project focused on the Lower Hall (the Upper Hall having been conserved in 2013). The project included a unique series of public 'ceiling tours' allowing members of the public to get up close to the painted ceiling and see conservators at work. In March 2019, the hall reopened to the public, the project winning awards.

== Gallery ==
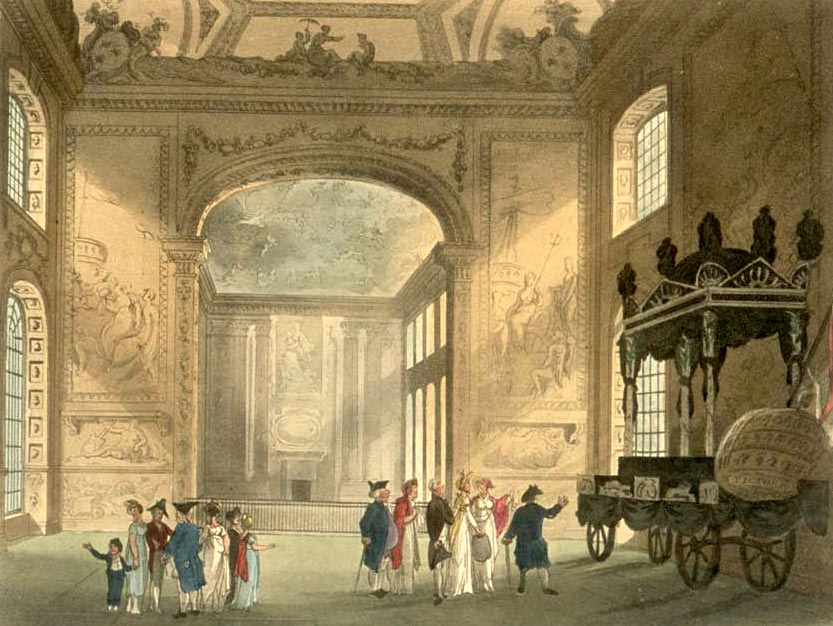
The Painted Hall of Greenwich Hospital as drawn by Augustus Pugin and Thomas Rowlandson

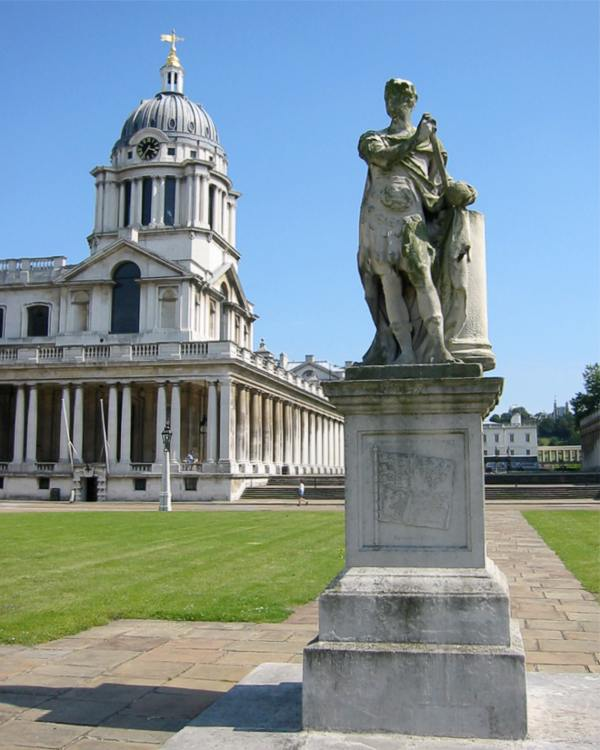
John Michael Rysbrack's George II (1735) in the Grand Square of the Greenwich Hospital

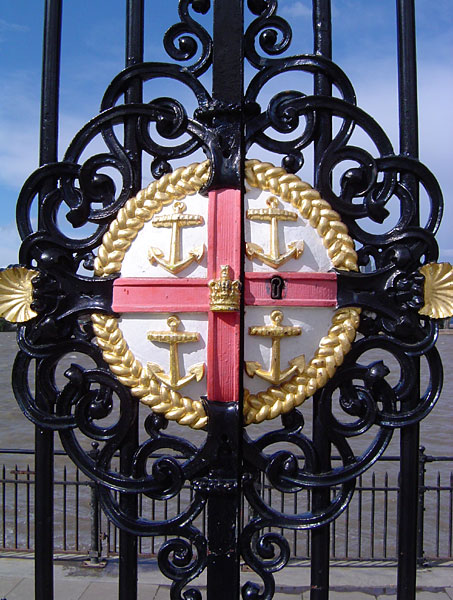
Badge of the Royal Hospital on the Water Gate of the Royal Naval College

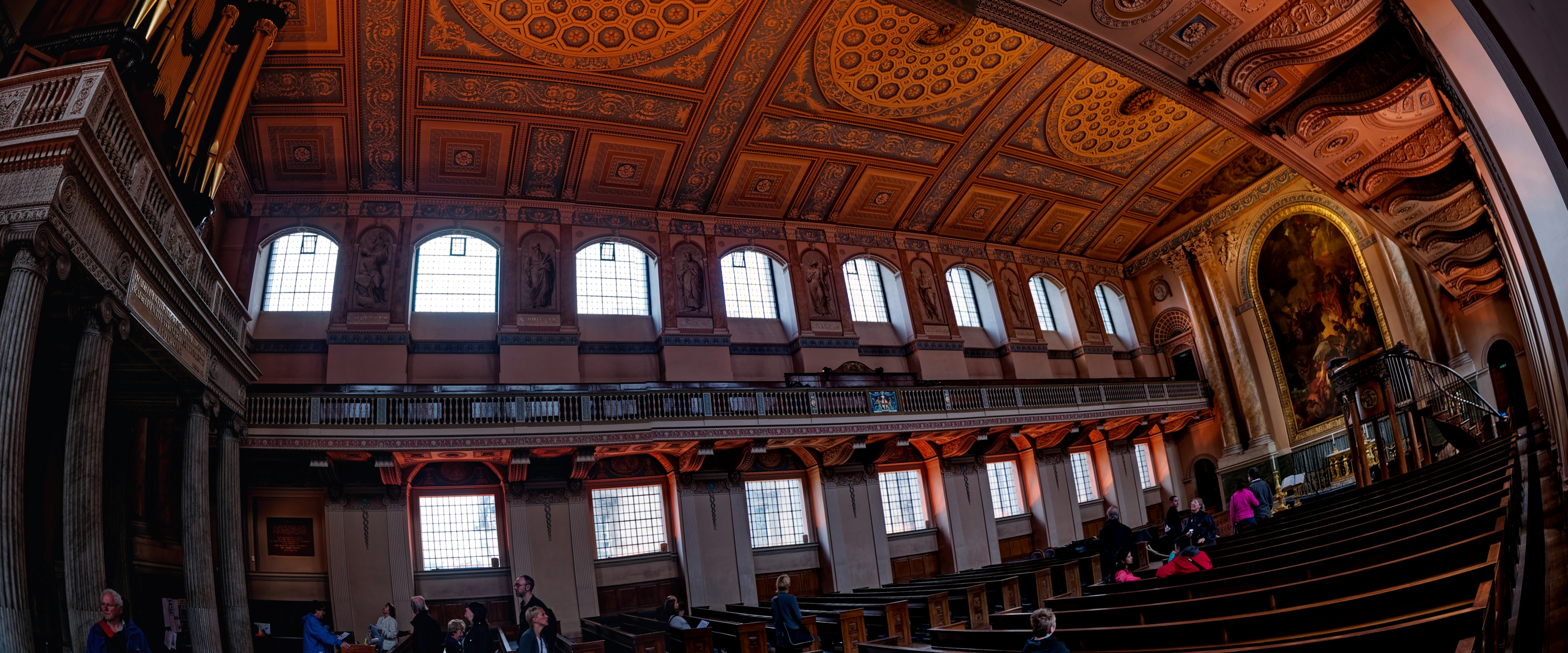
North side of the Old Royal Naval College, Greenwich, designed by Sir Christopher Wren (1696–1712); chapel completed in 1789 by James "Athenian" Stuart with details by William Newton.
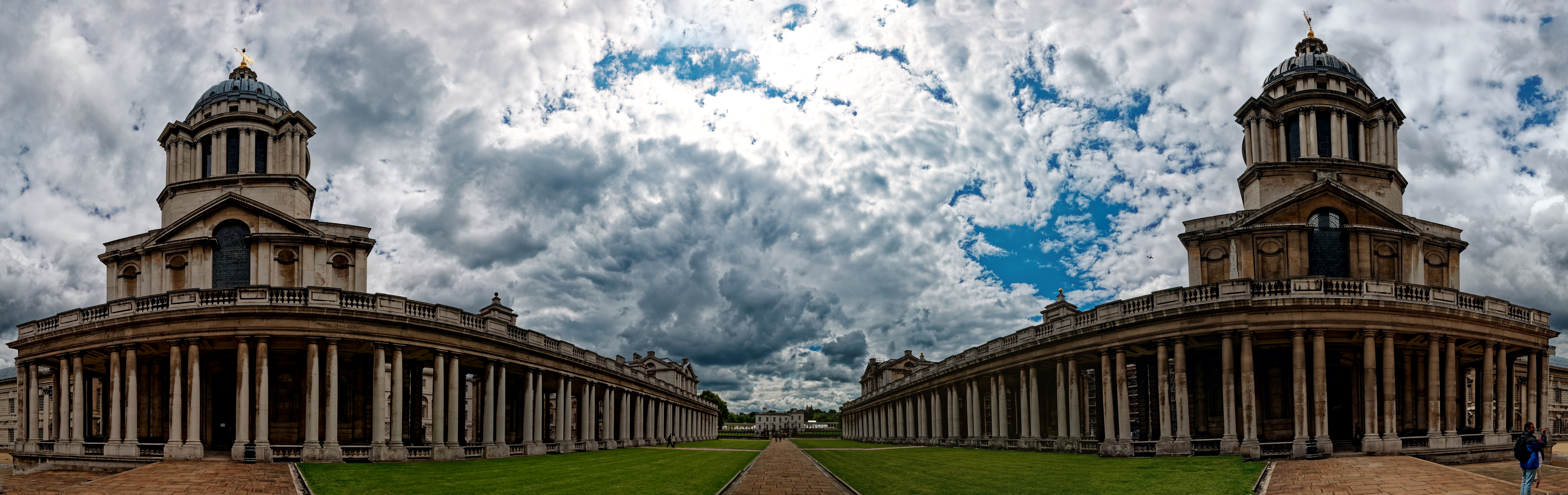
View of the Old Royal Naval College from the Grand Square
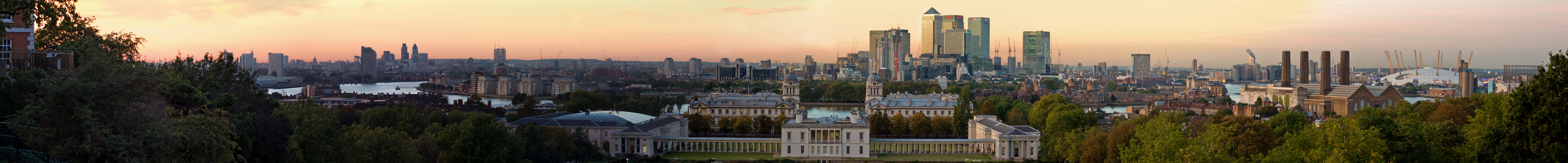
Royal Naval College in Greenwich, view from Greenwich Park

== See also ==
- Greenwich Hospital Act
- Discover Greenwich Visitor Centre
