= John Davidson (Royal Navy officer) =

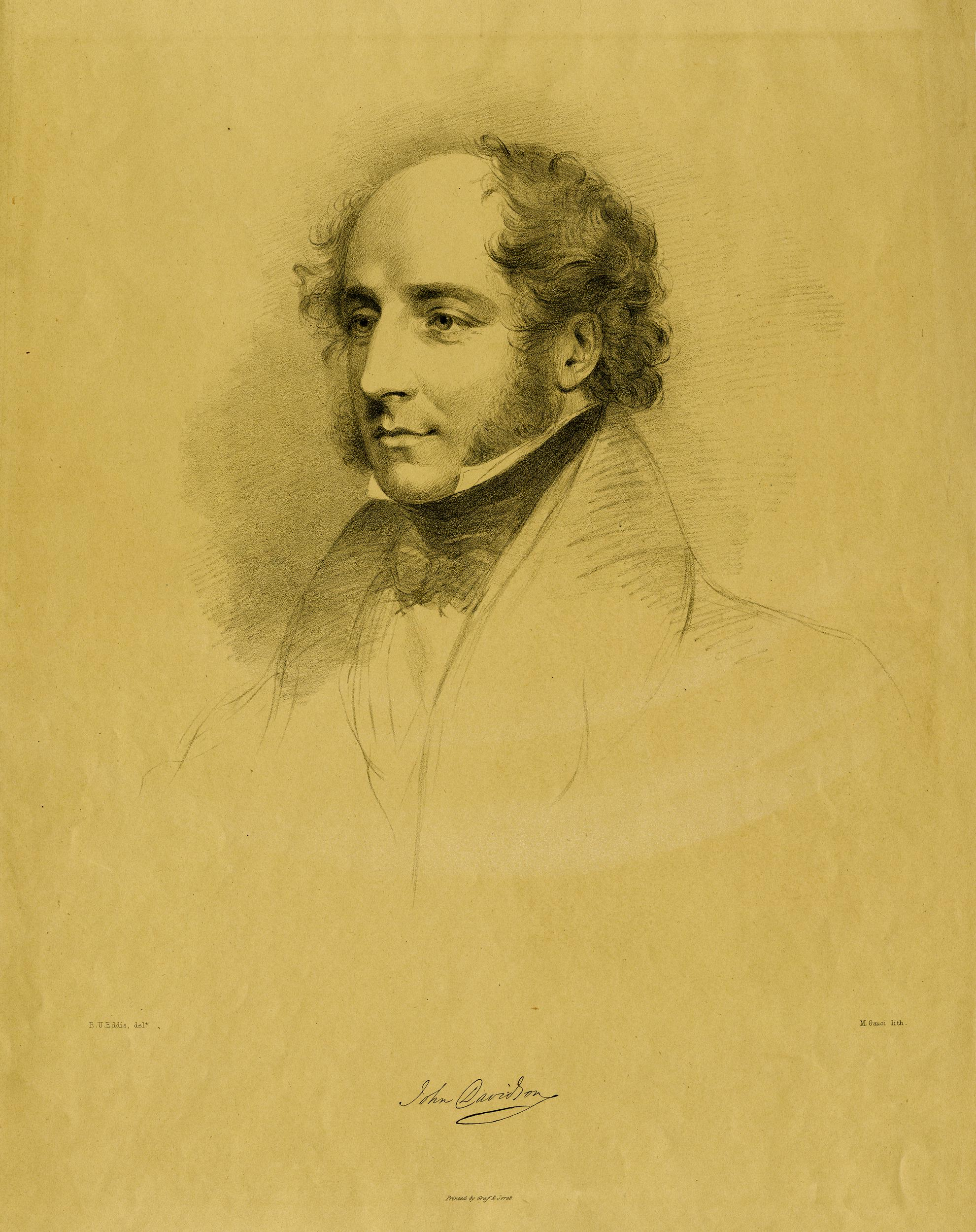
John Davidson

John Davidson (died 31 January 1881) was an English surgeon who served as Inspector-General of the Royal Navy and was Honorary Physician to Queen Victoria.

== Career ==
Davidson joined the Royal Navy as an assistant surgeon on 29 July 1839, serving on HMS Nimrod when it sailed from Plymouth to the East Indies. He served as surgeon-superintendent on the Lord Auckland from September 1852 to April 1853 when the ship carried convicts from Cork to Van Diemen's Land, arriving on 29 January 1853.

As a deputy inspector of hospitals, he was director of the naval hospital at Therapia during the Crimean War, sailing on the Royal Albert in 1855. During the 1860s, he was medical inspector at Greenwich Hospital, London. He was appointed Inspector-General of Hospitals and Fleets in July 1866.

Davidson was appointed Honorary Physician to Queen Victoria in July 1874, succeeding Sir Alexander Nisbet.

He died, aged 63, in 1881 and was buried in the Greenwich Hospital's cemetery (today East Greenwich Pleasaunce).
