= John Liddell (Royal Navy officer) =

Scottish medical doctor

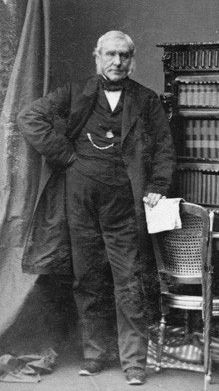
John Liddell by Camille Silvy, April 1861

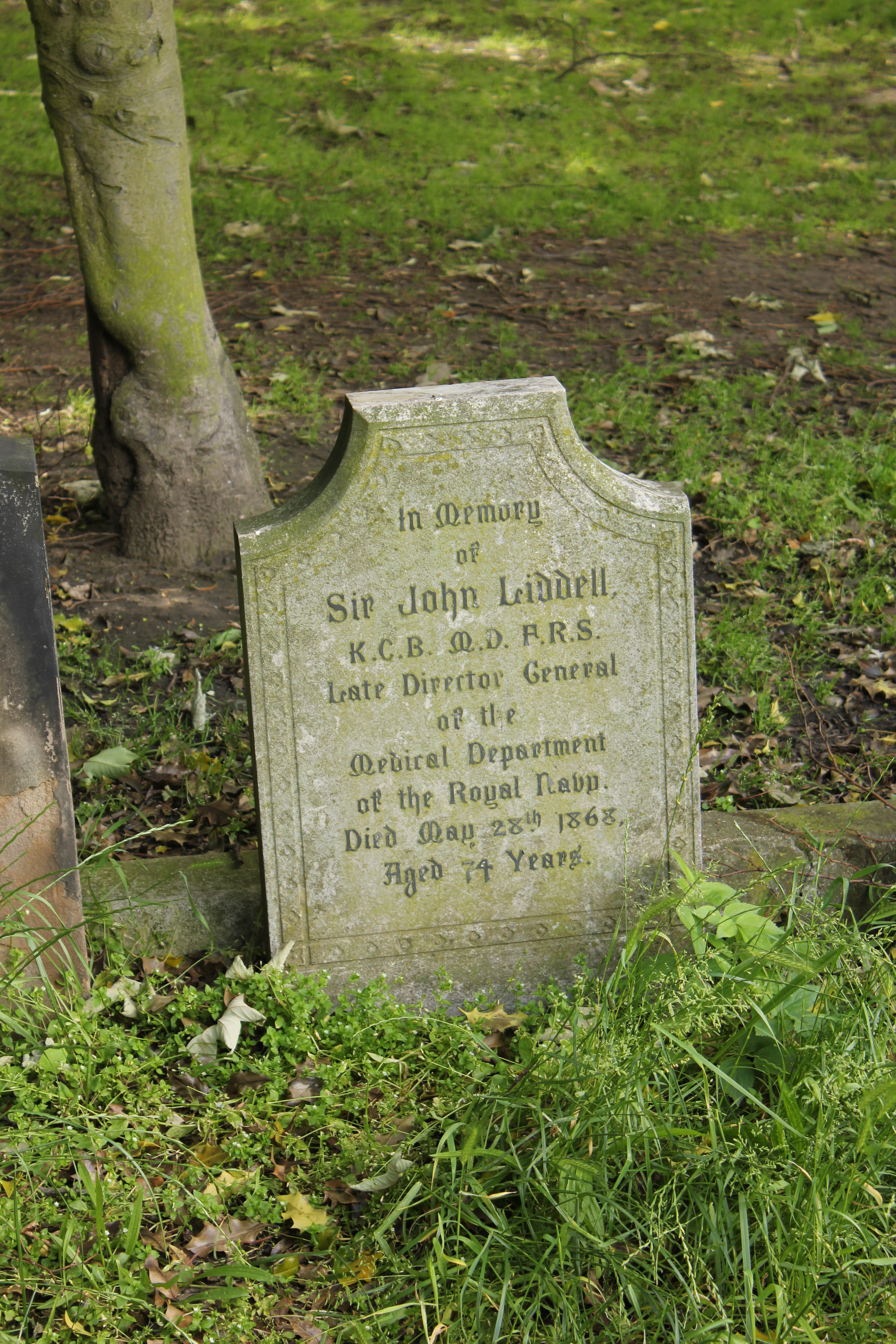
Gravestone of Sir John Liddell in East Greenwich Pleasaunce, London

Sir John Liddell, KCB, FRS (1794 – 28 May 1868) was a Scottish medical doctor who served as Director-General of the Medical Department of the Royal Navy (30 April 1855 – 21 January 1864), and senior medical officer of the Royal Hospital at Greenwich.

Born in Dunblane in 1794, Liddell was educated at the University of Edinburgh before joining the Royal Navy where he saw service on HMS Asia at the Battle of Navarino (1827). For his preparations for the battle, he was subsequently one of the first recipients of the Gilbert Blane Medal in 1832.

During a period as director of Malta's Bighi Naval Hospital (1827–1844), he served on HMS Barham during Sir Walter Scott's 1831 voyage to Naples. He was appointed inspector of fleets and hospitals in 1844.

He was elected a fellow of the Royal Society on 18 June 1846, knighted in 1848, appointed a Companion of the Order of the Bath in 1850 and promoted to Knight Commander of that Order on 9 February 1864.

Succeeding Sir William Burnett, his time as Director-General coincided with the Crimean War, which brought him into contact with Florence Nightingale with whom he was subsequently in occasional contact regarding hospital design; at his request, Nightingale inspected Haslar Hospital in January 1857, and he later accompanied her on a visit to Chatham hospital.

Liddell died at his London home at 72 Chester Square, and was buried on 2 June 1868 in the Greenwich Hospital's cemetery (today East Greenwich Pleasaunce). In 1837, Liddell had married Fanny, daughter of Robert Clement Sconce; a great-grandson was the writer Robert Liddell.
