= London from Greenwich Park =

Painting by J. M. W. Turner

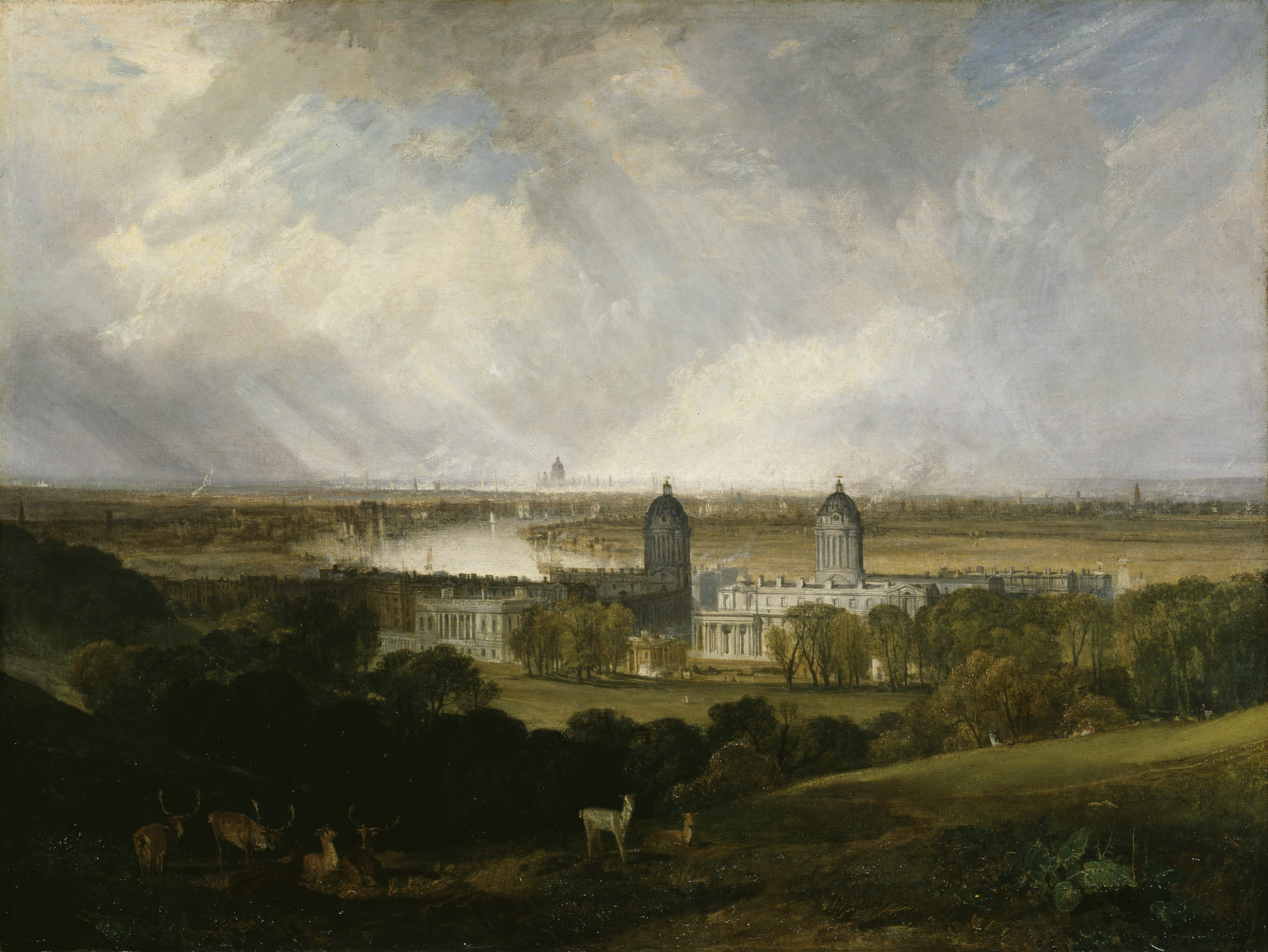
- Artist: J. M. W. Turner
- Year: 1809
- Type: Oil on canvas
- Dimensions: 90 cm × 120 cm (35 in × 47 in)
- Location: Tate Britain, London
- Website: www.tate.org.uk/...n00483

London from Greenwich Park is an 1809 landscape painting by the English artist J. M. W. Turner. It looks down from Greenwich Hill towards Greenwich Hospital and the Queen's House. In the distance beyond the River Thames is the City of London with St Paul's Cathedral towering over the other buildings. It emphasises the extent of the capital as an expanding metropolis. It replicates a similar view by the Dutch painter Hendrick Danckerts in his View of Greenwich and the Queen's House dating back to 1670.

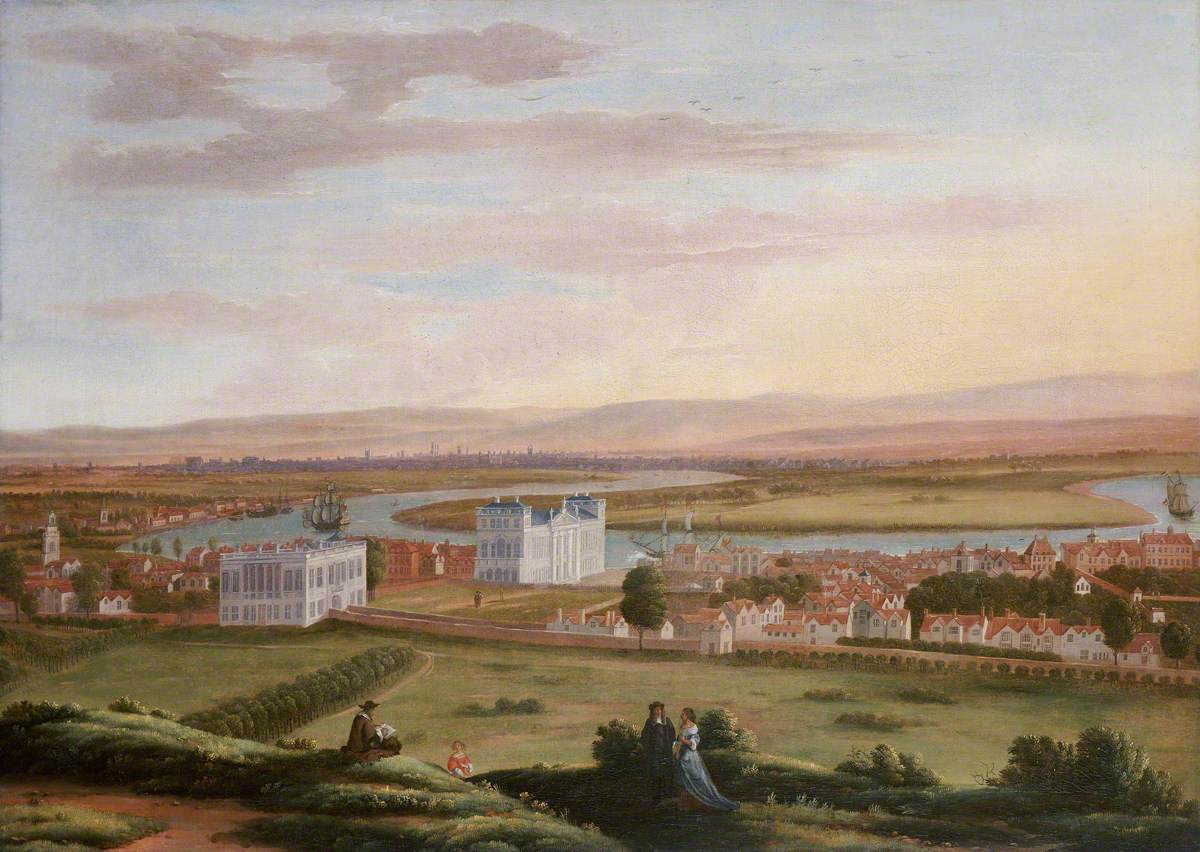
View of Greenwich and the Queen's House by Hendrick Danckerts, 1670

It was displayed at Turner's own studio in Queen Anne Street in Marylebone. As part of the Turner Bequest in 1856, it came into the hands of the British government. It is now in the Tate Britain collection.

== See also ==
- List of paintings by J. M. W. Turner

== Bibliography ==
- Finley, Gerald. Angel in the Sun: Turner's Vision of History. McGill-Queen's Press, 1999.
- Hamilton, James. Turner - A Life. Sceptre, 1998.
- Robinson, Alan. Imagining London, 1770-1900. Springer, 2004.
