= East Greenwich Pleasaunce =

Park and burial ground in London

Coordinates: 51°29′05″N 0°00′50″E

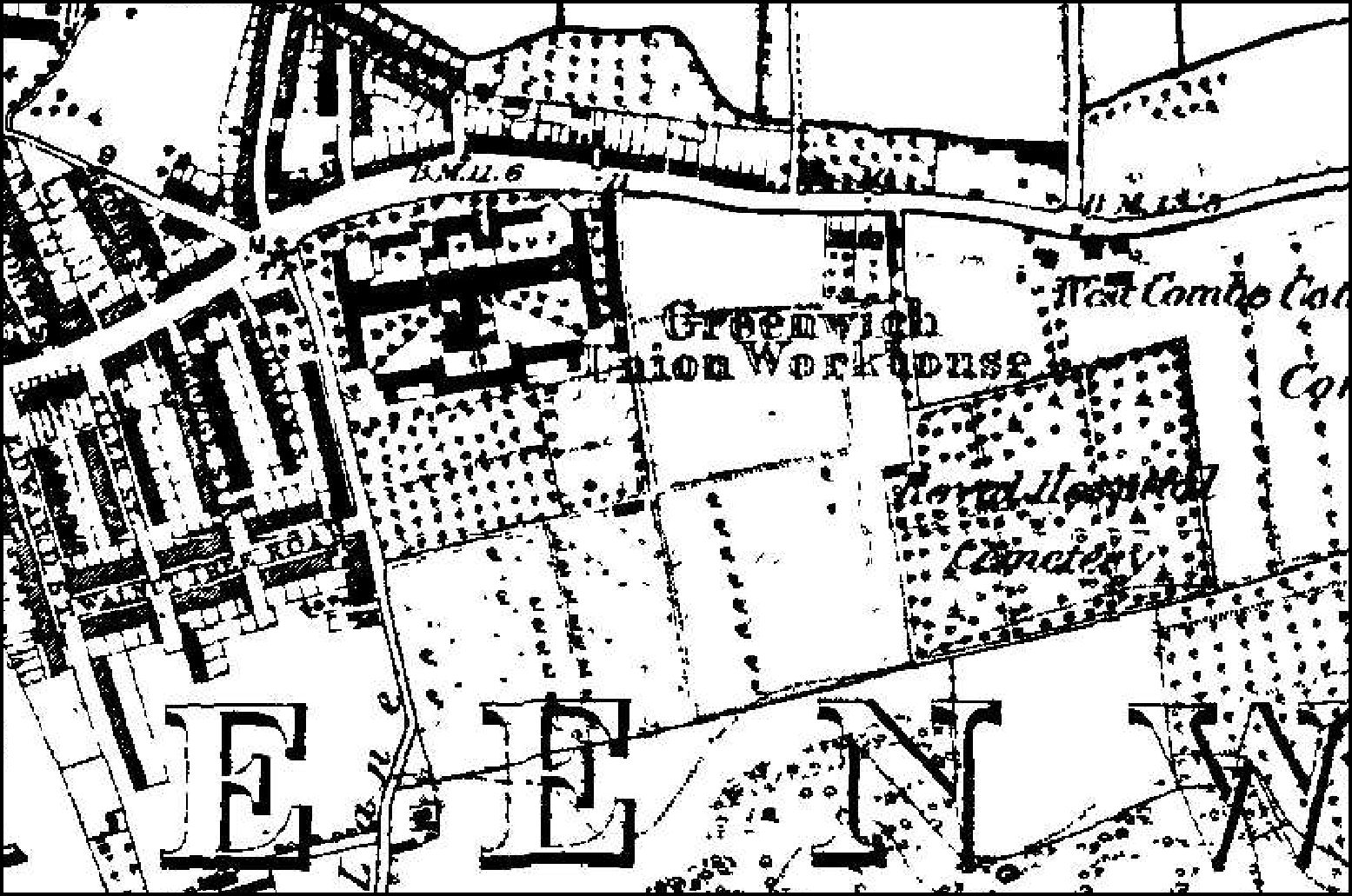
1882 map showing Greenwich Hospital cemetery to southeast of workhouse

East Greenwich Pleasaunce is a public park in East Greenwich, in south-east London. It is situated to the north side of the railway line between Maze Hill and Westcombe Park railway stations and south of the A206 Woolwich Road.

The park, opened in 1857, was originally the graveyard of Greenwich Hospital. Due to construction of a railway tunnel as part of the London and Greenwich Railway, the remains of around 3000 sailors and officers, including those who fought in the Battle of Trafalgar and the Crimean War were removed from the hospital site in 1875 and reinterred in the Pleasaunce (named after the former Royal Palace of Placentia or Palace of Pleasaunce).

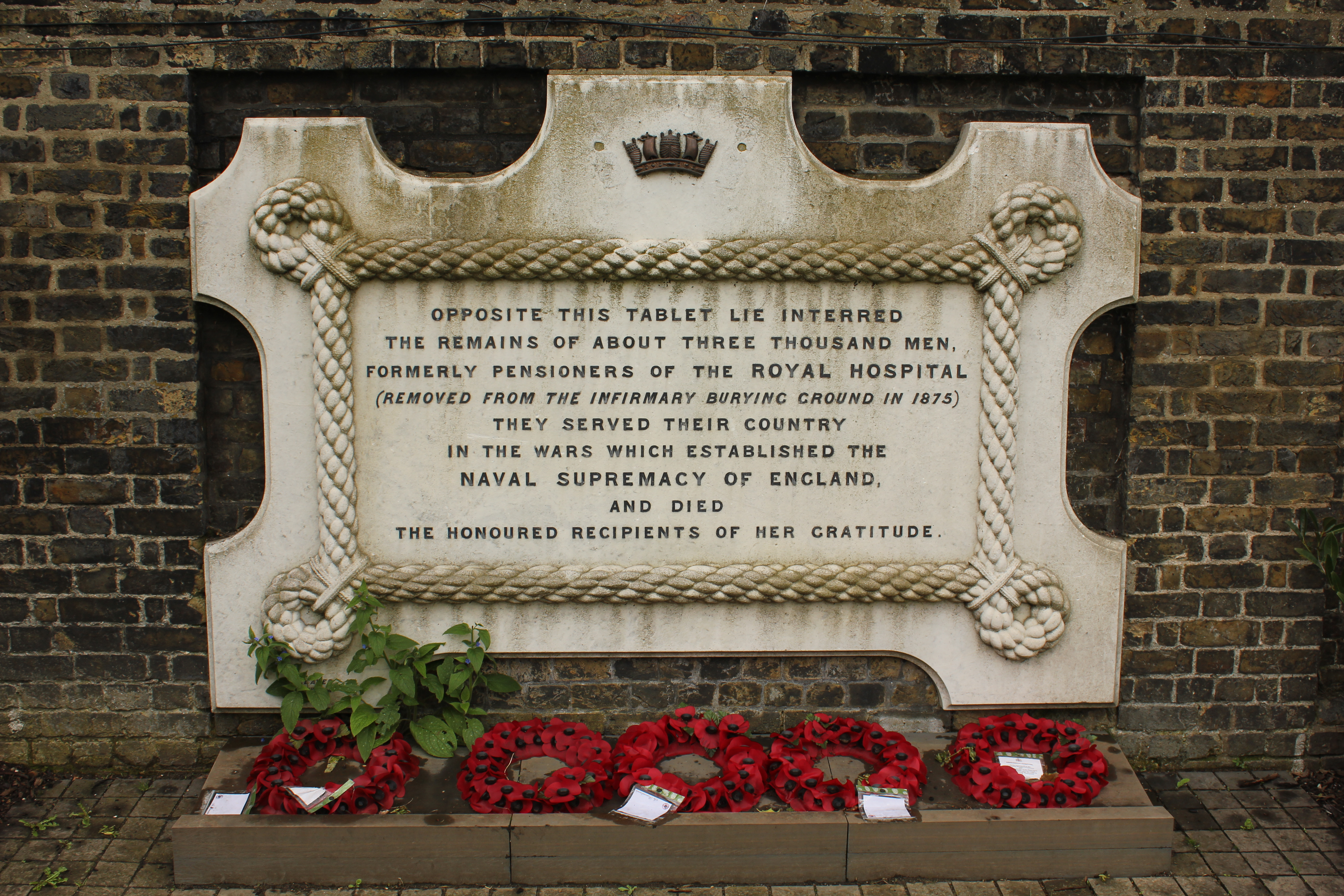
Plaque regarding mass burial site at East Greenwich Pleasaunce.

Those buried in the Pleasaunce include:

- Lieutenant James Berry (d. 1930), Curator of the Royal Naval Museum for 17 years
- John Booth (1781–1858). Born Northowram, West Yorkshire. Served at the Battle of Trafalgar as a Royal Marine in HMS Revenge. In July 1852 became a Greenwich Hospital in-pensioner.
- John Davidson (d. 1881), surgeon, Inspector-General of the Royal Navy, and Honorary Physician to Queen Victoria.
- Sir John Liddell (d. 1868), Director-General of the Medical Department of the Royal Navy (1855–1864)
- Edward Robinson (c.1847-1926), Metropolitan Police officer who arrested Charles Peace in Blackheath, died in poverty at Greenwich Union Hospital, but was granted permission by the Admiralty to be buried here.
- Anthony Sampayo (c.1818-1862), French Minister Plenipotentiary to Hesse-Kassel, whose father's sister Maria was married to William Cunningham Dalyell, an inhabitant and employee of the Hospital.
- James Shepherd (d. 1907) for 18 years Queen Victoria's boatswain's mate on the Royal Yacht HMY Victoria and Albert (1855)

There are 19 Commonwealth naval personnel burials of the 1914–1918 war and two from the 1939–1945 war.

In 1926 the Pleasaunce was sold to the Metropolitan Borough of Greenwich, the Admiralty reserving rights of further burials. Railings around the tombstones were removed and part of the ground was landscaped as a park.

Today, the Pleasaunce has a small children's playground (installed in 2001), a community centre (The Bridge, formerly the under-5s One O'clock Club run by Royal Borough of Greenwich), a cafeteria and a small war memorial.

The park is also a common meeting point for an active community of local dog owners, who have been staging a dog nativity play during the Christmas season in the park since 2024.
