= Greenwich Hospital, London =

Home for retired sailors (1692–1869)

Coordinates: 51°28′56″N 0°00′24″W

Greenwich Hospital from the North Bank of the Thames by Canaletto, 1750

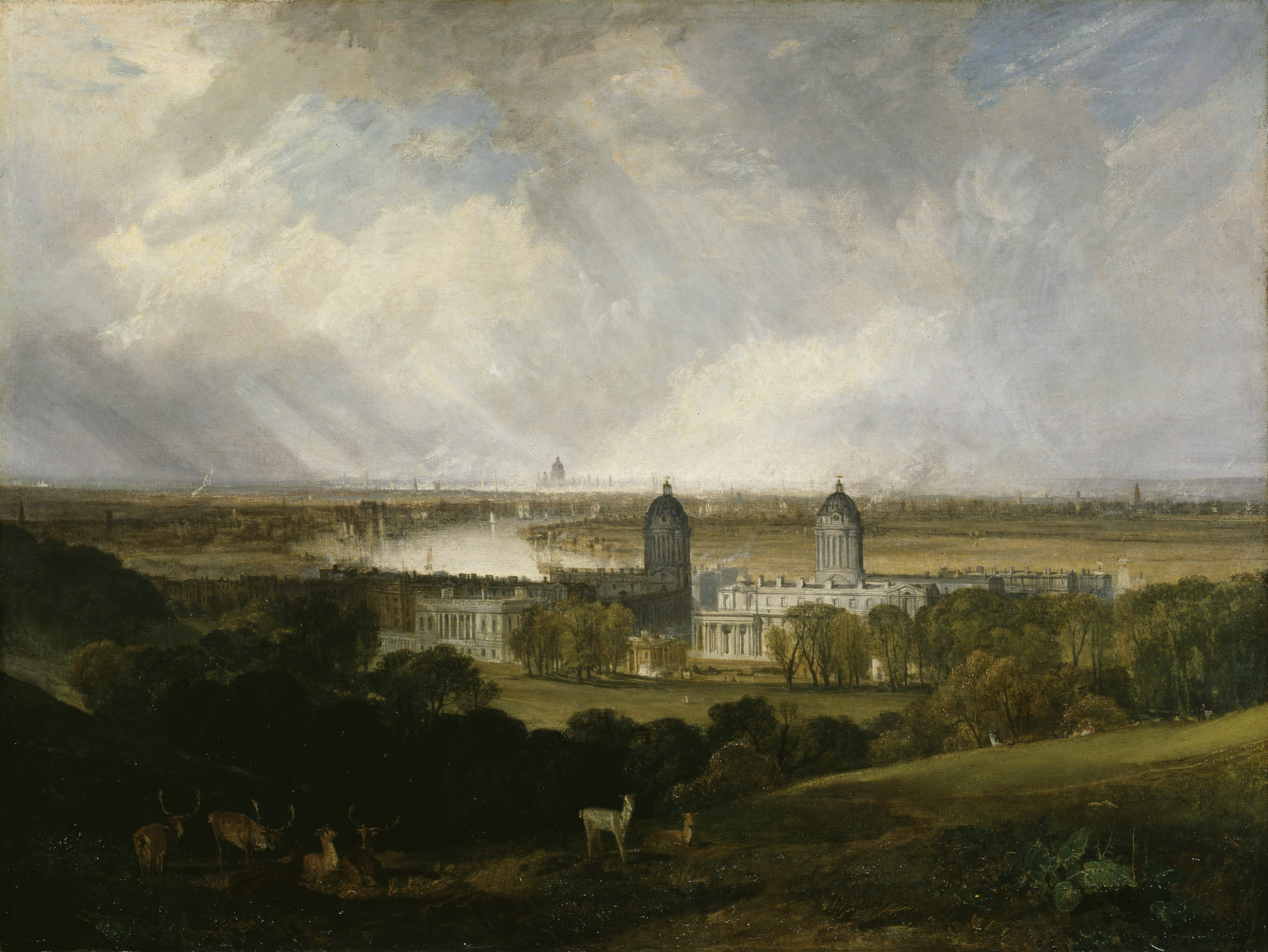
Greenwich Hospital, in the painting London from Greenwich Park, in 1809, by William Turner

Greenwich Hospital was a permanent home for retired sailors of the Royal Navy, which operated from 1692 to 1869. Its buildings, initially Greenwich Palace, in Greenwich, London, were later used by the Royal Naval College, Greenwich and the University of Greenwich, and are now known as the Old Royal Naval College. The word "hospital" was used in its original sense of a place providing hospitality for those in need of it, and did not refer to medical care, although the buildings included an infirmary which, after Greenwich Hospital closed, operated as Dreadnought Seaman's Hospital until 1986.

The foundation which operated the hospital still exists, for the benefit of former Royal Navy personnel and their dependants. It now provides sheltered housing on other sites.

== History ==
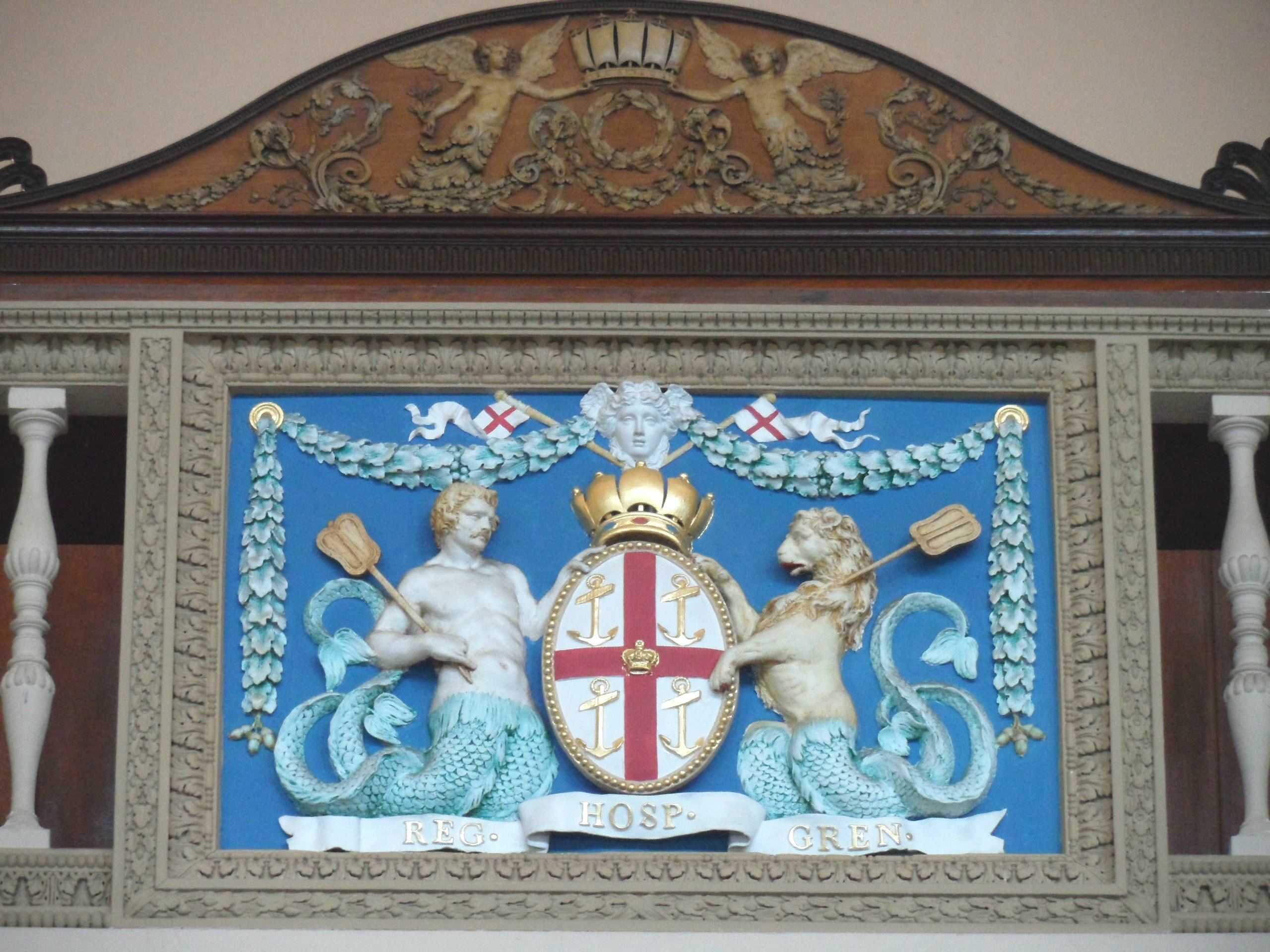
Detail in the Chapel of Saint Peter and Saint Paul

The hospital was created as the Royal Hospital for Seamen at Greenwich on the instructions of Queen Mary II, who had been inspired by the sight of wounded sailors returning from the Battle of La Hogue in 1692. She ordered the King Charles wing of the palace—originally designed by architect John Webb for King Charles II in 1664—to be remodelled as a naval hospital to provide a counterpart for the Chelsea Hospital for soldiers. Sir Christopher Wren and his assistant Nicholas Hawksmoor gave their services free of charge as architects of the new Royal Hospital. Sir John Vanbrugh succeeded Wren as architect, completing the complex to Wren's original plans.

An early controversy arose when it emerged that the original plans for the hospital would have blocked the riverside view from the Queen's House. Queen Mary II therefore ordered that the buildings be split, providing an avenue leading from the river through the hospital grounds up to the Queen's House and Greenwich Hill beyond. This gave the hospital its distinctive look, with its buildings arranged in a number of quadrants. Its four main buildings (the "Courts") are bisected north–south by a Grand Square and processional route, and east–west by an internal road from the East Gate (and gate-house) to the West Gate (and gate-house) by Greenwich Market in Greenwich town centre. The Grand Square and processional route running north–south maintained access to, and a river view from, the Queen's House and Greenwich Park beyond.

Greenwich Hospital, etc. Act 1695
- Act of Parliament
- Parliament of England
- Long title: An Act for the Increase and Encouragement of Seamen.
- Citation: 7 & 8 Will. 3. c. 21
- Territorial extent: England and Wales

Dates
- Royal assent: 10 April 1696
- Commencement: 22 November 1695 (Note: Start of session.)
- Repealed: 31 December 1834
Other legislation
Amended by	Greenwich Hospital, etc. Act 1696
Repealed by	Greenwich Hospital Act 1834

Status: Repealed

Text of statute as originally enacted

Greenwich Hospital, etc. Act 1696
- Act of Parliament
- Parliament of England
- Long title: An Act to enforce the Act for the Encrease and Encouragement of Seamen.
- Citation: 8 & 9 Will. 3. c. 23
- Territorial extent: England and Wales

Dates
- Royal assent: 16 April 1697
- Commencement: 20 October 1696
- Repealed: 31 December 1834
Other legislation
Amends	Greenwich Hospital, etc. Act 1695
Repealed by	Greenwich Hospital Act 1834

Status: Repealed

Text of statute as originally enacted

Construction was financed through an endowment, financed through the transfer of £19,500 in fines paid by merchants convicted of smuggling in 1695, a public fundraising appeal which brought in £9,000, and a £2,000 annual contribution from Treasury. Parliament passed the Greenwich Hospital, etc. Act 1695 (7 & 8 Will. 3. c. 21), long titled An Act for the Increase and Encouragement of Seamen, which established the basic rules of use and benefits for seamen, and amended it the following year by the Greenwich Hospital, etc. Act 1696 (8 & 9 Will. 3. c. 23). In 1705 an additional £6,472 was paid into the fund, comprising the liquidated value of estates belonging to the recently hanged pirate Captain William Kidd.

The first of the principal buildings constructed was the King Charles Court (the oldest part dating back to the restoration), completed in March 1705.

The other principal buildings constructed included:

- Queen Mary Court (planned by Wren and Hawksmoor, but not built until after Wren's death, by Thomas Ripley), completed in 1742
- Queen Anne Court (architects: Wren and Hawksmoor)
- King William Court (designed by Wren, but completed by Hawksmoor and Sir John Vanbrugh)

King William Court is famous for its baroque Painted Hall, which was painted by Sir James Thornhill in honour of King William III and Queen Mary II (the ceiling of the Lower Hall), of Queen Anne and her husband, Prince George of Denmark (the ceiling of the Upper Hall) and George I (the north wall of the Upper Hall). The Painted Hall was deemed too magnificent for the pensioned seamen's refectory and was never regularly used as such. It became a tourist destination, opened for viewing. On 5 January 1806, Lord Nelson's body lay in state in the Painted Hall of the Greenwich Hospital before being taken up the river Thames to St Paul's Cathedral for a state funeral. Nelson's Pediment in the William Courtyard was sculpted in Coade stone in 1813 as a public memorial, and was regarded by the Coade workers as the finest of all their work. In 1824 a National Gallery of Naval Art was created in the Painted Hall, where it remained until 1936, when the collection was transferred to the National Maritime Museum, newly established in the Queen's House and adjacent buildings.

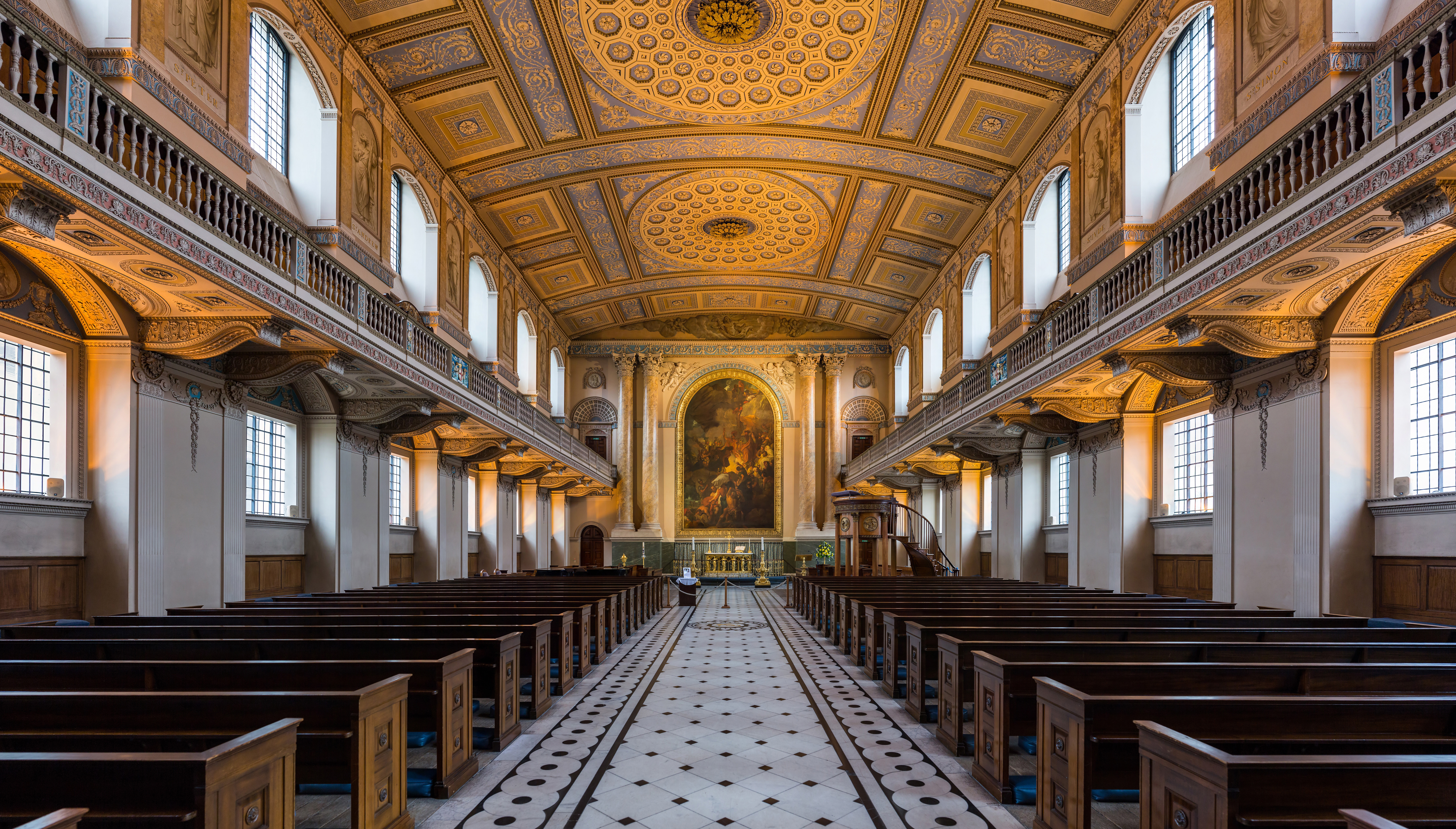
Chapel, as refitted by James Stuart after a fire

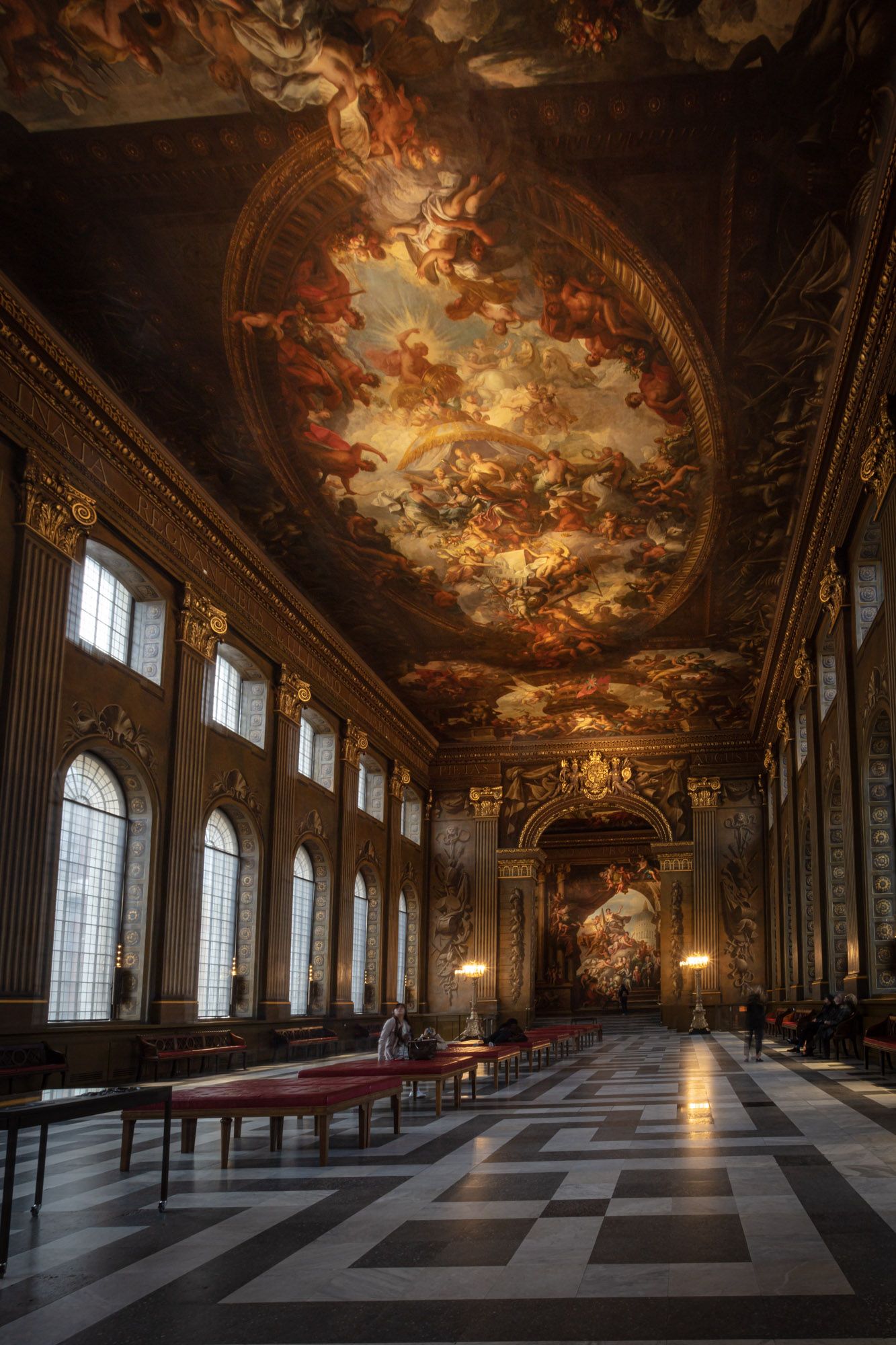
The Painted Hall

On the riverside front of the north-east corner of King Charles Court is an obelisk, designed by Philip Hardwick and unveiled in 1855, erected in memory of the Arctic explorer Joseph René Bellot, who died in an unsuccessful attempt to rescue the members of John Franklin's ill-fated expedition to open a Northwest Passage in northern Canada.

The first governor, Sir William Gifford, took up office in 1708. In 1774, the then Lieutenant Governor, Captain Thomas Baillie made allegations of mismanagement of the hospital's affairs, which led to a celebrated court case.

A Royal Hospital School opened on the site in 1712 to provide assistance and education to the orphans of seafarers in the Royal and Merchant Navies. In the 1820, the school incorporated the Royal Naval Asylum. In 1933 it moved to Holbrook, Suffolk (where it remains today); the old school buildings were reopened the following year as the National Maritime Museum.

In 1737, the Commissioners of Greenwich Hospital were granted the estates of the Earl of Derwentwater, which had been confiscated by the Crown following the Jacobite rising of 1715. In 1768, the Commissioners established a lead smelting works at Langley, Northumberland to smelt their ore from Alston Moor.

The Greenwich Hospital buildings included an infirmary, constructed in the 1760s to a design also by James Stuart, where pensioners were attended by trained medical staff (Sir John Liddell was for a time senior medical officer). After some adaptation and rebuilding this became the Dreadnought Seamen's Hospital in 1870 (taking its name from a hospital ship moored off Greenwich). The treatment for tropical diseases moved in 1919 to the Seamen's Hospital Society hospital near Euston Square, in central London, to form the Hospital for Tropical Diseases. The Dreadnought Seaman's Hospital closed in 1986, with special services for seamen and their families then provided by the Dreadnought Unit at St Thomas's Hospital in Lambeth.

Greenwich Hospital closed in 1869, with the buildings being taken over by the Royal Naval College, Greenwich in 1873.

Due to railway construction, the remains of thousands of sailors and officers, including many of those who had fought in the Battle of Trafalgar, were removed from the hospital site in 1875 and reinterred in East Greenwich Pleasaunce also called Pleasaunce Park (named after the former Palace of Placentia which had been on the site of the hospital).

== Governors ==
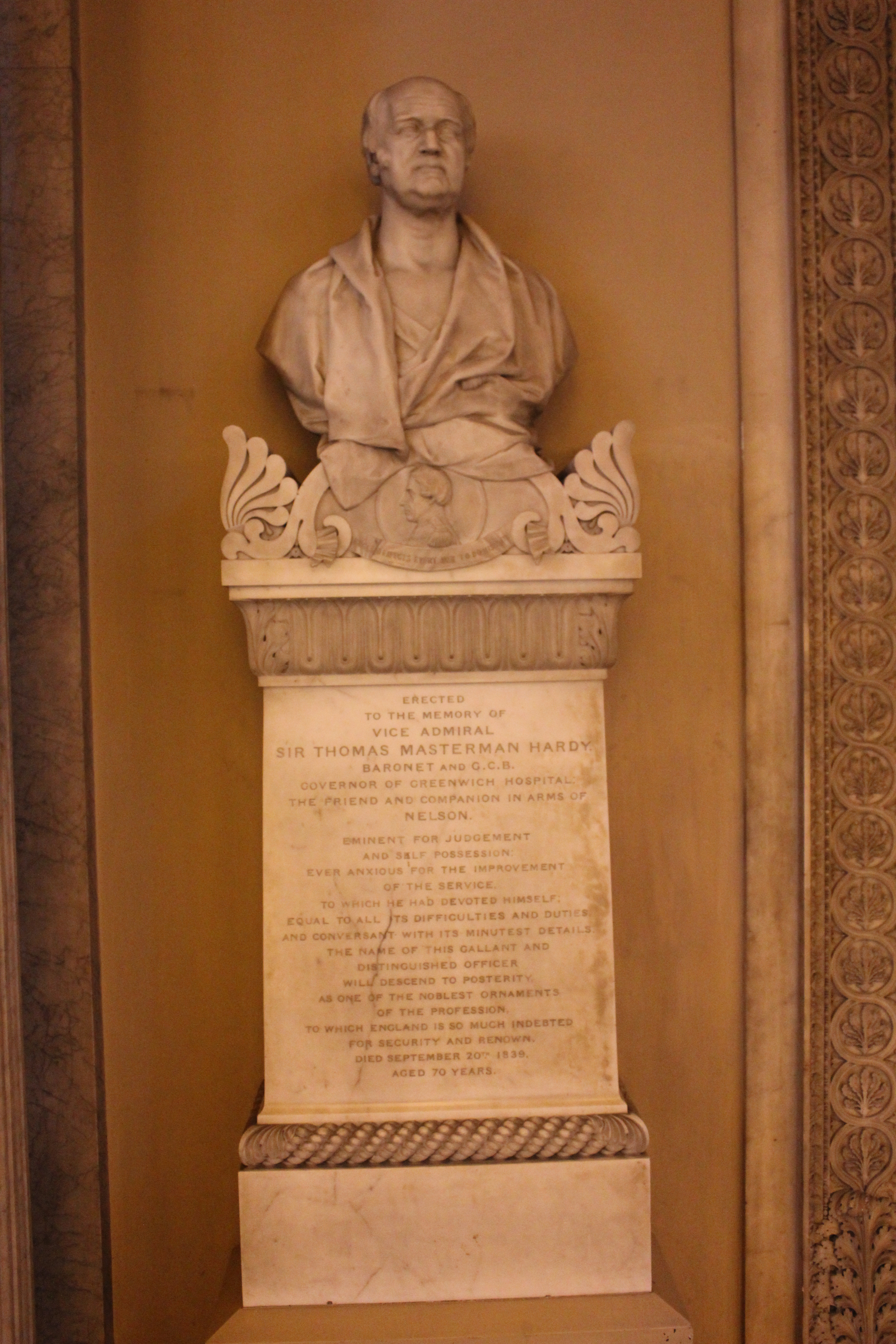
Memorial to Sir Thomas Hardy in Chapel at Greenwich's Old Royal Naval College.

Governors included:

- Vice-Admiral Thomas Hopsonn (1704–1708)
- Captain Sir William Gifford (1708–1714)
- Vice-Admiral Lord Aylmer (1714–1720)
- Admiral Sir John Jennings (1720–1743)
- Admiral Sir John Balchen (1743–1744)
- Captain Lord Archibald Hamilton (1746–1754)
- Admiral Isaac Townsend (1754–1765)
- Admiral Sir George Rodney (1765–1770)
- Admiral Sir Francis Holburne (1771)
- Admiral Sir Charles Hardy (1771–1780)
- Admiral Sir Hugh Palliser (1780–1796)
- Admiral Viscount Hood (1796–1816)
- Admiral Sir John Colpoys (1816–1821)
- Admiral Sir Richard Keats (1821–1834)
- Vice-Admiral Sir Thomas Hardy (1834–1839)
- Admiral Sir Robert Stopford (1841–1847)
- Admiral Sir Charles Adam (1847–1853)
- Admiral Sir James Gordon (1853–1869)
- Admiral Sir Houston Stewart (1869–1872)
- Admiral Sir Sydney Dacres (1872–1884)
- Admiral Sir Lewis Jones (1884–1895)

== Greenwich Hospital: the charity ==
Greenwich Hospital

The charitable foundation of Greenwich Hospital still exists, although it is no longer based at the original site. It is now a Crown body for the benefit of seafarers and their dependants, with the Secretary of State for Defence acting as The Crown's sole trustee. The charity now funds sheltered housing for former Royal Navy personnel and the school the hospital spawned, the Royal Hospital School, now at Holbrook in Suffolk. Greenwich Hospital's head office is located in the City of London.

The Crown body derives some of its funds from properties in and around the hospital site. The core hospital buildings are let on a 150-year lease to the University of Greenwich and Trinity Laban College of Music. Greenwich Promenade is let to the Port of London Authority, while retail and residential properties in central Greenwich, including Greenwich Market, form the charity's core investment portfolio.

In August 2020, several market traders warned they might have to cease trading after Greenwich Hospital's managing agent Knight Frank informed them of steep rent increases during the COVID-19 pandemic. After complaints, it was reported in September 2020 that the rent hikes would be reversed.

== See also ==
- Healthcare in London
- List of hospitals in England
