= List of public art in the Royal Borough of Greenwich =

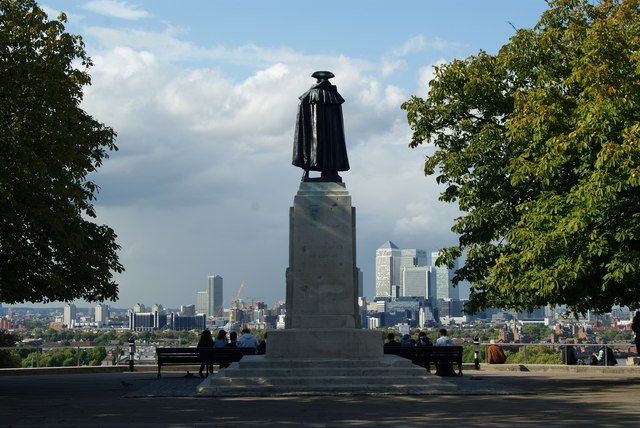
The statue of General Wolfe at Greenwich Park

This is a list of public art in the Royal Borough of Greenwich.

== Avery Hill ==
Image	Title / subject	Location and coordinates	Date	Artist / designer	Type	Material	Dimensions	Designation	Notes
	Hermes	Winter Garden 51.45024°N 0.07627°E	c. 1889	After Giambologna	Architectural sculpture			Grade II	

== Blackheath ==
Image	Title / subject	Location and coordinates	Date	Artist / designer	Type	Material	Dimensions	Designation	Notes
More images	Borough of Greenwich War Memorial	Corner of Charlton Way and Maze Hill 51.4752°N 0.0097°E	1922	?	War memorial	Portland stone		Grade II	Unveiled 11 November 1922.
	St John the Evangelist's Church War Memorial	East end of St John the Evangelist's churchyard, Stratheden Road 51.4758°N 0.01904°E	1922	J. B. L. Tolhurst (designer); Hoare and Sons (sculptors)	Memorial cross	Portland stone	c. 5.3 m	Grade II	Unveiled 11 November 1922.

== Charlton ==
Image	Title / subject	Location and coordinates	Date	Artist / designer	Type	Material	Dimensions	Designation	Notes
More images	Charlton War Memorial	Green opposite St Luke's Church 51.4814°N 0.0358°E	1920	R. G. Hoare, after Reginald Blomfield	Memorial cross	Portland stone		Grade II	Unveiled 31 October 1920. A modified version of Blomfield's Cross of Sacrifice design.
More images	Statue of Sam Bartram	The Valley 51.4867°N 0.0355°E	2005	Anthony Hawken	Statue	Bronze		—N/a	Unveiled 9 June 2005.
	Portage	Charlton House Peace Garden 51.48029°N 0.03744°E	2006	Margaret Higginson	Statue			—N/a	Inspired by the Amnesty International campaign "Stop Violence Against Women".
	Thames Barrier Memorial	Thames Barrier 51.49397°N 0.03739°E	2018		Memorial			—N/a	Memorial to those who have worked on the Thames Barrier and other Thames flood defences.

== Deptford ==
Image	Title / subject	Location and coordinates	Date	Artist / designer	Type	Material	Dimensions	Designation	Notes
	Memorial to Margaret McMillan	Rachel McMillan Nursery School, McMillan Street 51.48136°N 0.02296°W	1932	Herbert Baker (architect)		Stone on brick plinth		Grade II	
More images	Memorial to Peter the Great	Glaisher Street 51.48333°N 0.01889°W	2001	Mihail Chemiakin	Statue			—N/a	
	His and Hers	Junction of Deptford High Street and Griffin Street 51.4779°N 0.0257°W	2002	Patricio Forrester	Mural	Masonry paint		—N/a	Refurbished 2016.
	Memorial to the Battle of Deptford Bridge	Deptford Bridge 51.471488°N 0.014639°W	2017	Gary Drostle	Sundial mosaic bench			—N/a	

== Eltham ==
Image	Title / subject	Location and coordinates	Date	Artist / designer	Type	Material	Dimensions	Designation	Notes
	Holy Trinity Church War Memorial	Holy Trinity churchyard, Southend Crescent 51.4484°N 0.0641°E	after 1918	?	Crucifix	Stone and bronze		—N/a	
More images	Eltham War Memorial	St John the Baptist's Church, High Street 51.4510°N 0.0514°E	1924	Reginald Blomfield	Memorial cross	Portland stone		Grade II	Unveiled 9 November 1924. Adapted from Blomfield's much-used Cross of Sacrifice design; he was present at the unveiling.

== Greenwich ==
Image	Title / subject	Location and coordinates	Date	Artist / designer	Type	Material	Dimensions	Designation	Notes
More images	Statue of George II	Old Royal Naval College 51.48361°N 0.00595°W	1735	John Michael Rysbrack	Statue			Grade II	
More images	The Immortality of Nelson	Nelson Pediment, Old Royal Naval College 51.48267°N 0.00563°W	1809–1812	Benjamin West and Joseph Panzetta	Architectural relief sculpture	Coade stone		Grade I	
	Bust of Horatio Nelson, 1st Viscount Nelson	Queen's House	1835	Francis Leggatt Chantrey	Bust	Marble			
More images	Statue of Sidney Smith	Colonnade between the Queen's House and the National Maritime Museum	1845	Thomas Kirk	Statue	Marble		—N/a	
More images	Statue of William IV	King William Walk 51.47989°N 0.00654°W	1845	Samuel Nixon	Statue	Foggin Tor Devon granite		Grade II	Erected 18–19 December 1844 on King William Street in the City of London; taken down in 1935 and re-erected here, on a smaller pedestal, the following year. The principal work of this sculptor, who received insufficient recompense from the work's commissioners and came close to financial ruin.
More images	Statue of Edward Pellew, 1st Viscount Exmouth	Colonnade between the Queen's House and the National Maritime Museum Administration Building	1846	Patrick MacDowell	Statue	Marble		—N/a	
	Statue of James Saumarez, 1st Baron de Saumarez	Colonnade between the Queen's House and the National Maritime Museum Administration Building	1853	John Steell	Statue	Marble		—N/a	
More images	Memorial to Joseph René Bellot	Cutty Sark Gardens 51.48364°N 0.00786°W	1855	Philip Hardwick	Obelisk			Grade II	
More images	Statue of William Peel	Colonnade between the Queen's House and the National Maritime Museum	1860	William Theed	Statue	Marble		—N/a	
More images	Memorial to the New Zealand Campaign (1863–1864)	King William Walk 51.4833°N 0.0091°W	1874	Andrew Clarke	Obelisk	Granite	50 ft high	Grade II	
	Busts of naval heroes	Pepys Building, Old Royal Naval College 51.48295°N 0.00874°W	1874–1883	Charles Raymond Smith	Reliefs			Grade II	Portrait medallions with busts of the following: 1. George Anson, 1st Baron Anson; 2. Francis Drake; 3. James Cook; 4. Charles Howard, 1st Earl of Nottingham; 5. Robert Blake; 6. John Benbow; 7. John Montagu, 4th Earl of Sandwich; 8. George Brydges Rodney, 1st Baron Rodney; 9. Adam Duncan, 1st Viscount Duncan; 10. Cuthbert Collingwood, 1st Baron Collingwood; 11. Richard Howe; 12. Horatio Nelson, 1st Viscount Nelson; 13. John Jervis, 1st Earl of St Vincent
More images	Statue of General James Wolfe	Blackheath Avenue, Greenwich Park 51.47782°N 0.00085°W	1930	Robert Tait McKenzie	Statue			Grade II	
More images	Statue of Walter Raleigh	Old Royal Naval College 51.48306°N 0.00867°W	1959	William McMillan	Statue			Grade II	Unveiled 28 October 1959 in Whitehall by the US Ambassador John Hay Whitney. Moved to this site in 2001 as it was out of scale with other statues which had since been erected nearby. The statue is close to the Discover Greenwich entrance within the grounds of the ORNC.
	Mermaid	University of Greenwich	1959	?	Statue	Silicon bronze		—N/a	
More images	Large Standing Figure (Knife Edge)	Greenwich Park 51.4752°N 0.0011°W	1961–1978	Henry Moore	Sculpture			—N/a	
More images	Dolphin Dial	Titanic Memorial Garden, Royal Observatory 51.47779°N 0.00190°W	1977–1978	Christopher St John Daniel and Edwin Russell	Equinoctial sundial with sculpture	Bronze		—N/a	Unveiled 5 June 1978 and moved to this site in 2009. Daniel was Head of Education Services at the National Maritime Museum; the work was commissioned to mark the Silver Jubilee of Elizabeth II.
	Greenwich Mural	Glenister Green, Woolwich Road 51.48646°N 0.011124°E	1972	Philippa Threlfall and Kennedy Collings	Mural	Glazed and unglazed ceramic and stone		—N/a	Depicts the maritime history of Greenwich. One of the earliest large-scale murals to be produced by the artists. Commissioned for the former Greenwich District Hospital, it was moved to its current location and restored in 2007.
More images	Statue of Captain James Cook	National Maritime Museum 51.48051°N 0.0048°W	1994	Arthur Weller	Statue			—N/a	
More images	Prime Meridian marker	Royal Observatory	1999	Christina Garzia	Sculpture			—N/a	
More images	Millennium Sundial	Greenwich Park 51.48133°N 0.00151°W	2000	Christopher St John Daniel	Sundial			—N/a	
More images	The Throne of Earthly Kings	Devonport House 51.4806°N 0.0073°W	2004	François Hameury	Sculpture			—N/a	
More images	Statue of Horatio Nelson, 1st Viscount Nelson	Trafalgar Tavern 51.4845°N 0.0045°W	2009	Lesley Povey	Statue	Bronze		—N/a	
More images	Monument for a Dead Parrot	University of Greenwich 51.4811°N 0.0077°W	2009	John Reardon	Sculpture	Bronze (spray-painted)		—N/a	
More images	Nelson's Ship in a Bottle	National Maritime Museum 51.48030°N 0.00531°W	2010	Yinka Shonibare	Sculpture			—N/a	Originally a temporary installation on Trafalgar Square's fourth plinth, it has been at the National Maritime Museum since 2012
More images	Encompass	Greenwich Market 51.48144°N 0.00952°W	2016	Michael Speller	Sculpture	Bronze	2.4m	—N/a	Unveiled 4 April 2016 by the Duke of York. Commissioned by Greenwich Hospital, the Crown Charity. Made from bronze, it is a 2.4m sphere made from 210 figures, depicting sailors as they climb a ship's rigging.

== Greenwich Peninsula ==
Image	Title / subject	Location and coordinates	Date	Artist / designer	Type	Material	Dimensions	Designation	Notes
More images	East Greenwich Gas Works War Memorial	West Parkside Road 51.4953°N 0.0121°E	1926	?	War memorial	Grey Aberdeen granite		Grade II	Unveiled 18 September 1926.
More images	Quantum Cloud	Greenwich Peninsula 51.50185°N 0.00913°E	2000	Antony Gormley	Sculpture			—N/a	Created for the millennium celebrations, now part of The Line art trail
More images	A Slice of Reality	Greenwich Peninsula 51.50418°N 0.00028°W	2000	Richard Wilson	Sculpture			—N/a	Created for the millennium celebrations, now part of The Line art trail
More images	Liberty Grip	Greenwich Peninsula 51.50437°N 0.00509°E	2008	Gary Hume	Sculpture			—N/a	Part of The Line art trail
More images	Here	Greenwich Peninsula 51.50316°N 0.00146°W	2013	Thomson & Craighead	Sculpture			—N/a	Part of The Line art trail
	Lenticular Dazzle Camouflage	Greenwich Peninsula 51.493905°N 0.007183°E	2016	Conrad Shawcross	Sculpture	metal	49 m high	—N/a	Part of the Greenwich Peninsula Low Carbon Energy Centre, and inspired by dazzle camouflage
More images	Hydra and Kali	Greenwich Peninsula 51.49875°N 0.01264°E	2016	Damien Hirst	Sculpture	metal		—N/a	Formerly part of Hirst's 2017 exhibition Treasures from the Wreck of the Unbelievable in Venice
More images	Mermaid	Greenwich Peninsula 51.50257°N 0.00682°E	2017	Damien Hirst	Sculpture	metal		—N/a	Formerly part of Hirst's 2017 exhibition Treasures from the Wreck of the Unbelievable in Venice
	Head in the Wind	Greenwich Peninsula 51.50176°N 0.00683°E	2019	Allen Jones	Sculpture		8 metres (26 ft)	—N/a	
More images	Demon with Bowl	Greenwich Peninsula 51.50012°N 0.00902°E	2023	Damien Hirst	Sculpture		60 feet (18 m)	—N/a	

== Lee ==
Image	Title / subject	Location and coordinates	Date	Artist / designer	Type	Material	Dimensions	Designation	Notes
More images	Men of St Peter's War Memorial	Courtlands Avenue 51.4567°N 0.0226°E	1920	Hatchard Smith and Son (designers); Farmer and Brindley (sculptors)	Memorial cross	Portland stone		Grade II	Unveiled 15 May 1920.

== Plumstead ==
Image	Title / subject	Location and coordinates	Date	Artist / designer	Type	Material	Dimensions	Designation	Notes
More images	George Webb Memorial Fountain	Winns Common 51.4806°N 0.0922°E	1896	?	Drinking fountain	Granite		—N/a	Webb was headmaster of Burrage Grove Boys' School.
More images	8th London Howitzer Brigade War Memorial	Plumstead Common 51.4819°N 0.0756°E	1922	?	War memorial	Portland stone		Grade II	Unveiled 7 October 1922.
	The Colourway	Underpass beneath Pettman Crescent Bridge	2026	Adam Nathaniel Furman; Adams & Sutherland (architects)	Murals			—N/a	More than 200 pupils from Heronsgate Primary School, Bannockburn Primary School and Plumstead Manor School contributed ideas to the decorative scheme.

== Shooter's Hill ==
Image	Title / subject	Location and coordinates	Date	Artist / designer	Type	Material	Dimensions	Designation	Notes
	Christ Church War Memorial	Churchyard of Christ Church 51.4649°N 0.0572°E	1922	?	Memorial cross	Stone		—N/a	Unveiled 8 October 1922.

== Thamesmead ==
Image	Title / subject	Location and coordinates	Date	Artist / designer	Type	Material	Dimensions	Designation	Notes
	Byron Close Arches	Byron Close, arches under Carlyle Road 51.5025°N 0.1198°E	2018	Rebecca Sutherland	Sculpture	Concrete	?	—N/a	Won the Wayfinding & Environmental Graphics category in the Design Week Awards 2018.[

== Woolwich ==
Image	Title / subject	Location and coordinates	Date	Artist / designer	Type	Material	Dimensions	Designation	Notes
More images	Statue of a barbarian ("Deus Lunus")	Royal Arsenal Brass Foundry, No 1 Street 51.49235°N 0.06939°E	late-Roman period (1st–3rd century AD)	?	Roman statue	Turkish marble		—N/a	Dug up by British troops in Alexandria, Egypt, in 1801 and shipped to Woolwich
	Crucifix	St Mary's Gardens, Greenlaw Street 51.4932°N 0.05881313°E	18th–19th century?	?	crucifix	wood		—N/a	Originally part of the church interior; moved here in 1966
More images	Statue of Arthur Wellesley, 1st Duke of Wellington	Royal Arsenal, Wellington Park 51.49354°N 0.07388°E	1848	Thomas Milnes	statue on pedestal	marble, Portland stone (plinth)		Grade II	Originally at the Tower of London, moved to the Arsenal in 1863
More images	Tom Cribb's tomb	St Mary's Gardens, Woolwich Church Street 51.493357°N 0.06018106°E	1851	?	statue	stone		Grade II	A lion resting its paw on an urn
More images	Crimean War Memorial	Royal Artillery Barracks, south end of parade ground 51.48513°N 0.06050292°E	1861	John Bell	statue with pedestal surrounded by 12 cannon-bollards	bronze and stone	3 m (without pediment)	Grade II	The figure of a woman distributing laurel wreaths, Honour, was cast from a Russian cannon captured at Sebastopol
More images	Major Little Memorial	Woolwich Common, Academy Rd / Ha-ha Road 51.482047°N 0.06133977°E	1861?	?	obelisk	stone		Grade II	
More images	Second Boer War Memorial	Grand Depot Road, opposite Royal Artillery Barracks 51.48416°N 0.06237°E	1902?	?	obelisk	granite		Grade II	Memorial to the men of the 61st Battery Royal Field Artillery who died in the Second Boer War (1899–1902)
More images	Statue of Alexander McLeod	Former Royal Arsenal Co-operative Society building, 125–161 Powis Street 51.49225°N 0.06318°E	1903	Alfred Drury	Statue in niche	Coade stone or terracotta?		Grade II	
	World War I memorial	Royal Arsenal, Grand Store, Cadogan Road 51.494216°N 0.07334383°E	1919?	?	relief	stone		—N/a	
	Maritime history of Woolwich	Woolwich Dockyard, Thames Path at Mast Pond Wharf 51.49444°N 0.05607°E	1984–86	community project	mosaic floor piece (damaged)	ceramic tesserae		—N/a	The mosaics are the result of a community project led by the National Elfrida Rathbone Society through an arts workshop based at the Clock House Community Centre
	Workers of Woolwich	Woolwich Arsenal station, platform 1 51.48971°N 0.06998°E	1993	Martin Williams	relief	terracotta		—N/a	The work was commissioned by British Rail's Community Unit with the University of Greenwich and Greenwich Council, and is a tribute to the tens of thousands of workers at the Royal Arsenal
	The Woolwich Ship	Plumstead Road, opposite the Royal Arsenal 51.491106°N 0.07086162°E	1999	Tom Grimsey	sculpture	steel		—N/a	The sculpture celebrates the naval history of Woolwich; commissioned by Woolwich Development Agency & Greenwich Council
	History of Woolwich Dockyard	Woolwich Church Street, Kingsman Parade pedestrian tunnel 51.49290°N 0.05573°E	2000	Stephen Lobb, Greenwich Mural Workshop & pupils of Cardwell Primary School	mosaic mural	ceramic tesserae		—N/a	The mosaics are the result of a project by the Greenwich Mural Workshop, with Stephen Lobb as the senior artist, working with Cardwell Primary School
More images	Assembly	Royal Arsenal, James Clavell Square 51.49485°N 0.070059°E	2001	Peter Burke	group of 16 statues	cast iron	188cm	—N/a	
	Memorial to Dial Square, Royal Arsenal and Woolwich Arsenal Football Clubs	Royal Arsenal, outside the Dial Arch pub 51.492502°N 0.06978873°E	c. 2005	?	sculpture	bronze, stone		—N/a	
	Street Life	Woolwich Arsenal station, Green's End / Beresford Square 51.490755°N 0.06852809°E	2008	Michael Craig-Martin	ceramic art, mural	ceramic	extends over two storeys	—N/a	More than 2500 individually screen-printed tiles by Manor Architectural Ceramics in Warwick
More images	Statue of Nike, goddess of victory	Royal Arsenal, No 1 Street, Main Guardhouse 51.49196°N 0.06938°E	9 Sept 2012	Pavlos Angelos Kougioumtzis	statue	bronze		—N/a	A gift of the people of Olympia to commemorate the 30th Olympiad in London in 2012
More images	Woolwich Buddy Bear	General Gordon Square 51.490046°N 0.06737977°E	27 May 2016	Michele Petit-Jean (after a design by pupils of Eltham Hill School)	statue	fibreglass		—N/a	Celebrating the 50th anniversary of friendship between the Royal Borough of Greenwich and the Berlin borough of Reinickendorf

== See also ==
- Statue of Yuri Gagarin, London – formerly at the Royal Observatory; later moved to the Science Museum

== Bibliography ==
- Blackwood, John (1989). London's Immortals: The Complete Outdoor Commemorative Statues. London and Oxford: Savoy Press. ISBN 978-0951429600.
- Kershman, Andrew (2013). London's Monuments. London: Metro Publications.
- Matthews, Peter (2018). London's Statues and Monuments. Oxford: Shire Publications.
