= Quantum Cloud =

Sculpture by Antony Gormley in London

Coordinates: 51.5018°N 0.0091°E

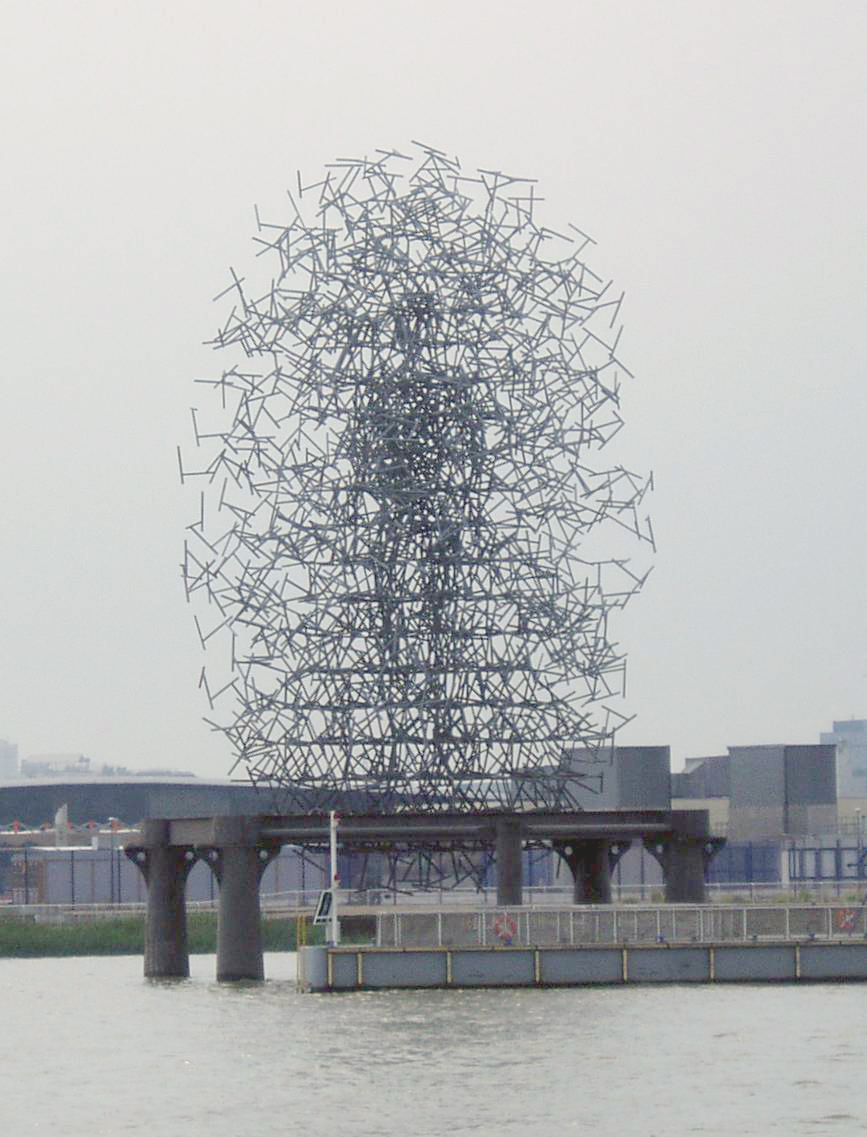
Quantum Cloud next to The O2 is Gormley's tallest sculpture to date

The Quantum Cloud is a contemporary sculpture, designed by Antony Gormley, located next to The O2 in London. The sculpture was commissioned for the site and was completed in 1999.

At 30 metres (98 ft) in height, it is Gormley's tallest sculpture to date (taller than the Angel of the North). It is constructed from a collection of tetrahedral units made from 1.5 m (4 ft 11 in) long sections of steel. The steel sections were arranged using a computer model with a random walk algorithm starting from points on the surface of an enlarged figure based on Gormley's body that forms a residual outline at the centre of the sculpture.

In designing Quantum Cloud, Gormley was influenced by Basil Hiley, quantum physicist (and long-time colleague of David Bohm). The idea for Quantum Cloud came from Hiley's thoughts on pre-space as a mathematical structure underlying space-time and matter, and his comment that "algebra is the relationship of relationships." The comment was made during a conversation between Gormley, Hiley and writer David Peat at a 1999 London gathering of artists and scientists, organised by Peat.

The sculpture's structural design was by Elliott Wood Partnership, while the foundation design was by Beckett Rankine. Fabrication was by Tubeworkers (Structures) Ltd.

Gormley's Quantum Cloud is part of The Line, a series of art works that follow the Greenwich Meridian, through the London Boroughs of Greenwich, Tower Hamlets and Newham.

== See also ==
- List of public art in Greenwich
