= Sylvester Smith (tennis) =

American tennis player

Dr Sylvester B Smith was an American black tennis player. He won the 1919 ATA Championships and also the Penn Tennis Open Championship.

Smith was based in New York and also won the 1929 National Colored Doubles Title as well as the 1930 New England Tennis Championship. From 1917–1929, he was the co-holder of the national men's doubles championships title. In 1959, Smith served as the president of the American Tennis Association.

Outside of tennis, Smith worked as a dentist in Philadelphia, where he died in 1969.

== See also ==
- Tally Holmes, his 1917 doubles partner
