= Bertrand Clark =

Jamaican sportsman (1894–1958)

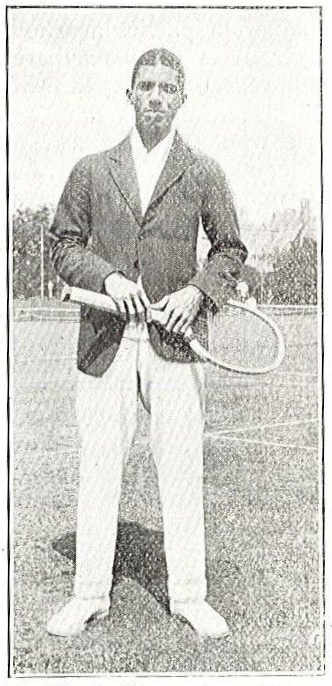
- Born: 29 April 1894
- Died: 30 March 1958 (aged 63)
- Occupation: Golfer, cricketer, tennis player, civil servant

Bertrand Milbourne Clark (29 April 1894 – 30 March 1958) was an all-round, amateur Jamaican sportsman, who excelled in golf, cricket and tennis, and was the first black person to compete at Wimbledon, in 1924.

== Family ==
Clark was born on 29 April 1894. He was descended from Thomas Milbourne Clark, his great grandfather, and Eleanor Fitzgerald, who married in 1824. Thomas was later described as "a free person of colour". Bertrand was the second son of Clementina Louise, née Sanguinetti, and Enos Edgar Clark, a dentist in Kingston.

He was educated at Kingston High School and then Jamaica College.

== Sporting career ==
Clark was a sporting polymath, and competed as an amateur. He represented Jamaica College at high jump at the first Inter-Secondary Schools Championship Sports at Sabina Park in 1910, where he came first. He subsequently became known in Jamaica as a top golfer.

He played for Melbourne Cricket Club alongside his brother Ronald (Note: Clark's brother is named as "Ronald" in the Gleaner obituary, but as "Robert" by Bauckham). He also played soccer.

He served as Secretary of the Jamaica Golf Association from 1941 to 1951.

=== Tennis ===
In seven consecutive years he was the All Jamaica tennis champion. In all, he won seven singles, seven doubles and five mixed titles at the championships. His male doubles partners were Charlie Brandon, H. V. Alexander, H. A. Lake and O. V. A. Lindo; and in mixed doubles (Note: Wilson and Calder as named in the Gleaner obituary; their own given names were not stated) Mrs William Wilson, Mrs C. C. Calder (later Mrs. Cy Elkins), Edna DaCosta and Olive Wilson.

He beat the American Tally Holmes to take the American Tennis Association title, for African American players, in 1920.

At Wimbledon in 1924, where he was the first black player to complete, he was defeated in the first round by Vincent Burr. In his only other recorded appearance there, in 1930, he was beaten in the first round by Herman David.

During a royal tour of the British Empire in 1927, Prince Albert, Duke of York (later King George VI) partnered Clark in a game of doubles; this was unusual at the time and was seen as a display of equality between races.

== Writing ==
With his brother, he wrote several books on cricket. He also wrote about golf and tennis.

== Personal life ==
From 1911, Clark worked as a civil servant, retiring as medical secretary of the Island Medical Office. He was twice married but had no children.

He was listed in the Jamaican Who's Who for 1946.

He died on 30 March 1958. An obituary was published in the Sunday Gleaner, which said that Clark was "perhaps the greatest all-round Jamaican sportsman of our time".
