= New Zealand Memorial =

War memorial in Greenwich, London

Coordinates: 51°29′00″N 0°00′33″W

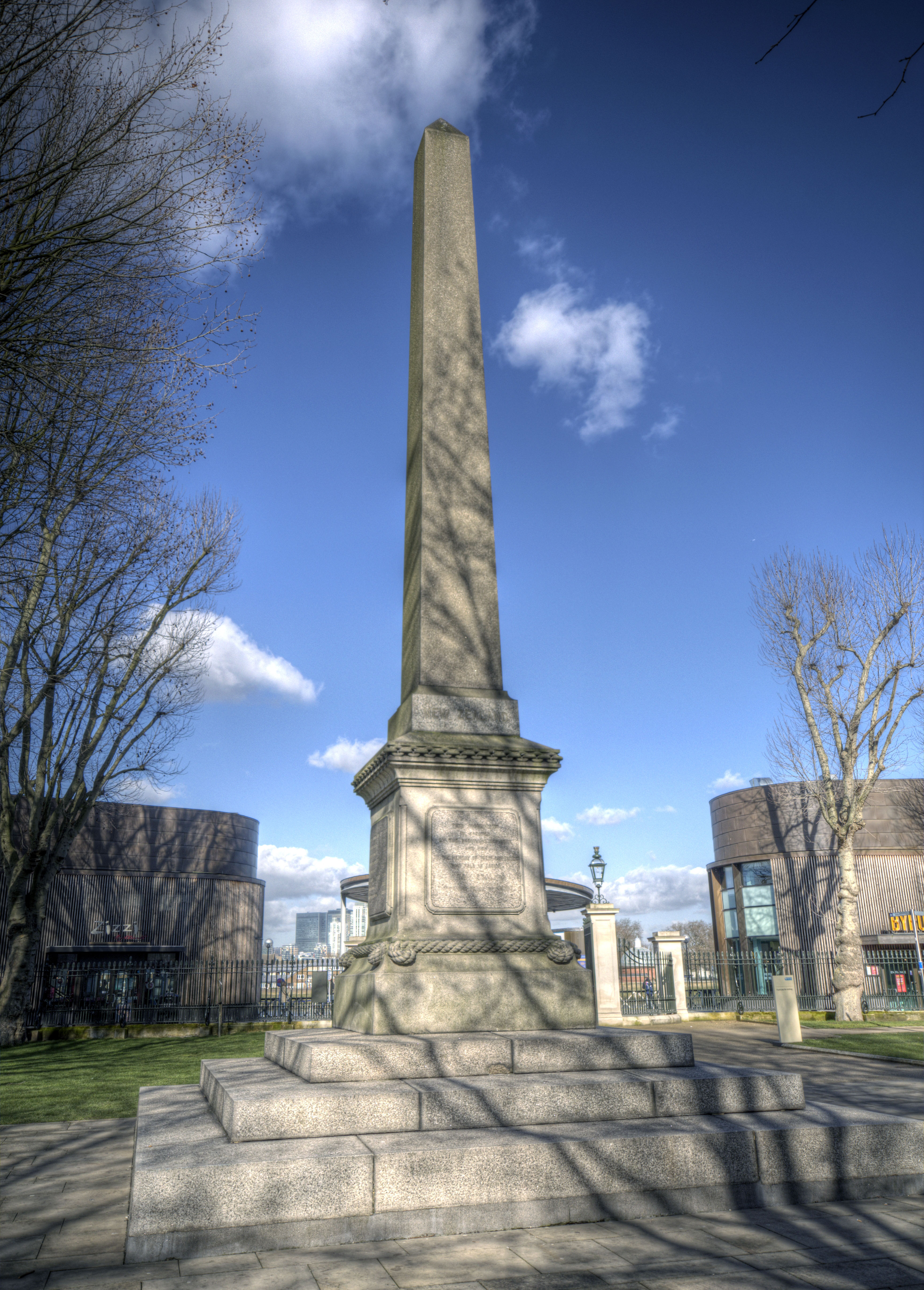
New Zealand Memorial in Greenwich

The New Zealand Memorial is an obelisk in Greenwich that commemorates 21 British officers and men of the Royal Navy who died in the New Zealand War of 1863–64. The memorial is located near the River Thames, east of the Cutty Sark, close to the Royal Naval College, Greenwich. It became a Grade II listed building in 1973.

The obelisk is made from pink-grey Cornish granite. It stands on a square plinth that rests on three wide steps. The plinth is decorated with mouldings resembling chains and ropes, and bears inscriptions on each side. It was constructed c. 1872 and became Grade II listed in June 1973.

The 21 dead commemorated by the memorial include Captain John Fane Charles Hamilton (who commanded HMS Esk and after whom the city of Hamilton is named), Commander Edward Hay (who commanded HMS Harrier), and other officers and men from Esk, Harrier, and HMS Curacoa, HMS Eclipse, and HMS Miranda.

The memorial was designed by Frederick Sang, who was commissioned by a memorial fund headed by Rear Admiral Sir William Wiseman, 8th Baronet, former commodore of the Australia Station. The obelisk was made by Charles Raymond Smith.

== See also ==
- List of public art in Greenwich
