= Nike (Kougioumtzis) =

Sculpture in multiple castings by Pavlos Angelos Kougioumtzis

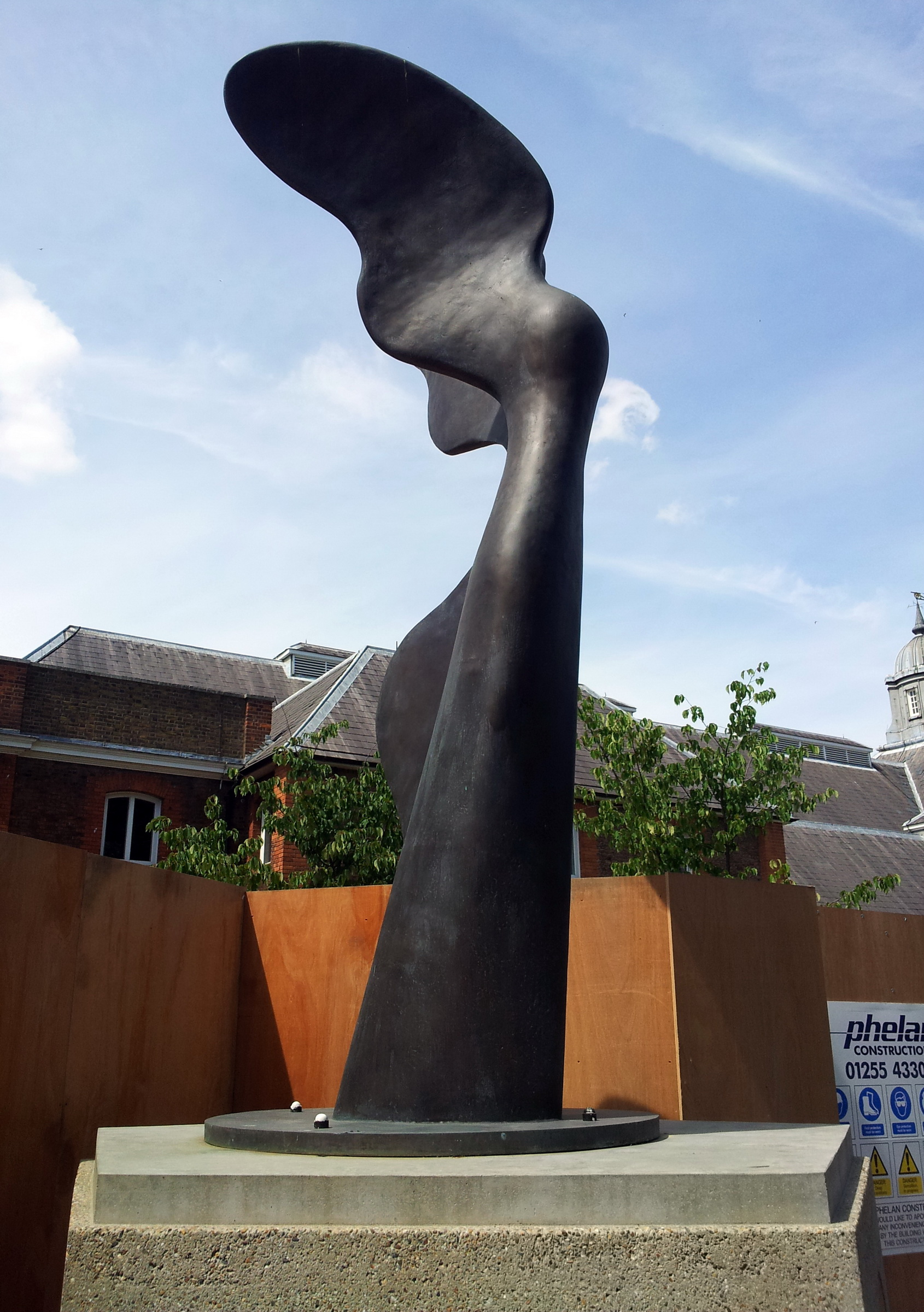
- The statue in front of the Royal Arsenal's Main Guardhouse in Woolwich, South East London
- Artist: Pavlos Angelos Kougioumtzis
- Type: Sculpture
- Medium: Bronze
- Subject: Nike
- Location: Olympia, Greece; Atlanta; Beijing; Vancouver; London

Nike is an abstract sculpture depicting Nike, the Greek goddess of victory, designed by Greek artist Pavlos Angelos Kougioumtzis. Versions of the statue have been donated to every host city of the Olympics since 1996.

== Olympia, Greece ==
A bronze, 3 metres (9.8 ft) tall version of the sculpture was installed at the International Olympic Academy in Olympia, Greece, in 1995.

== Atlanta ==
A bronze, 3.5 metres (11 ft) tall version of the statue was installed outside Atlanta City Hall in Atlanta, Georgia, in 1996.

== Beijing ==
A bronze, 4 metres (13 ft) tall version of the sculpture was installed in Beijing, China, in 2008.

== Vancouver ==
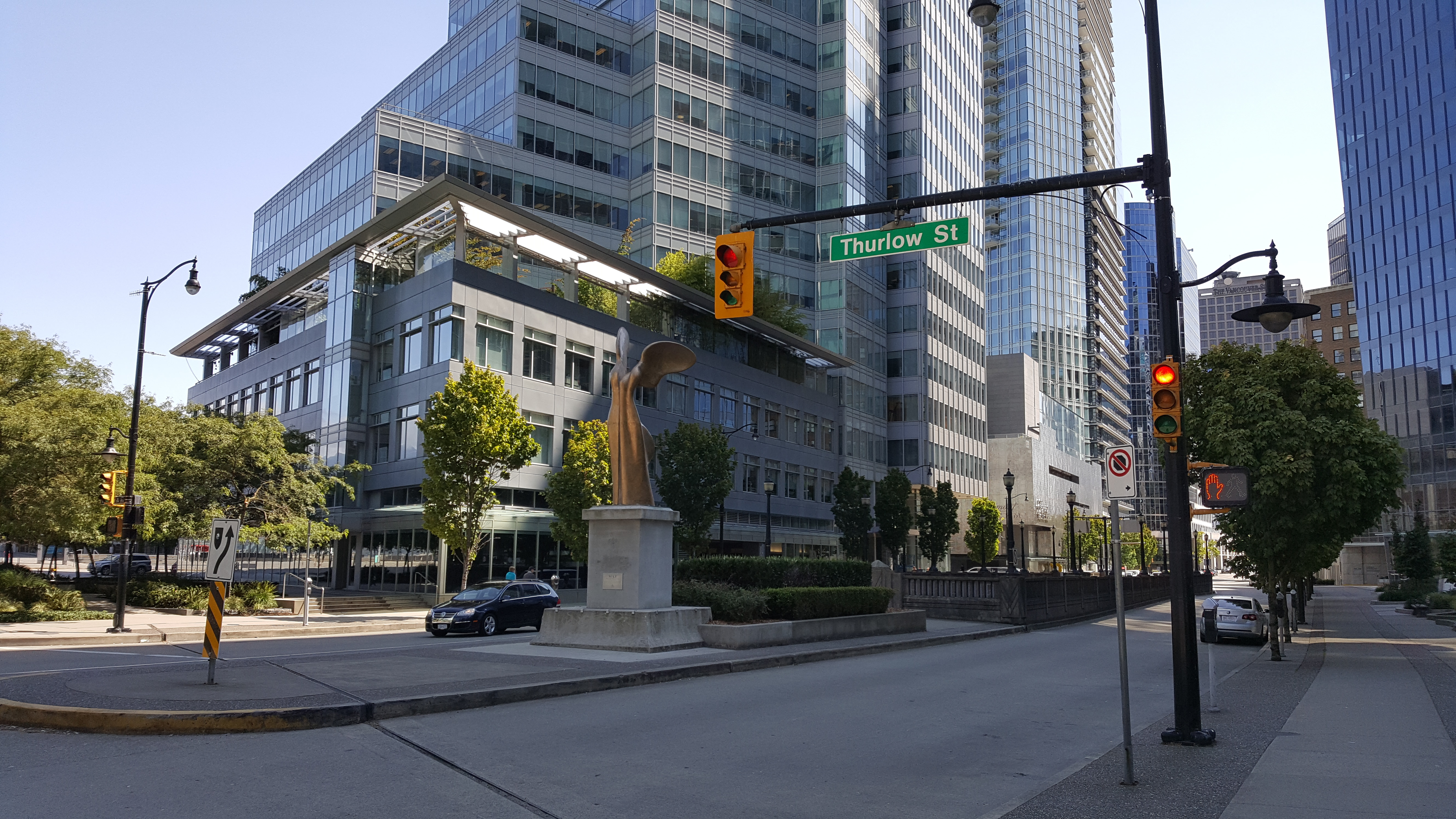
The Vancouver sculpture in 2016

The Vancouver statue was donated by the city of Olympia to commemorate the 2010 Winter Olympics and Paralympics. It was installed at the Cordova Street median at Thurlow in 2014, after being stored at the city works yard for four years. The bronze sculpture is 4 metres (13 ft) tall.

== London ==
A version of the statue was installed in the Royal Arsenal, Woolwich, London in 2012. It is made of bronze.

== See also ==
- List of public art in Greenwich
