= Tally Holmes =

American tennis player

Talley Robert "Tally" Holmes (December 9, 1889 in Washington, D.C. − March 1, 1969 in Washington, D.C.) was an American tennis player in the 1910s and 1920s.

Holmes was among the founders in 1916 of the American Tennis Association (ATA). Holmes and other representatives from dozens of black tennis clubs met in Washington, D.C., on Thanksgiving Day to create a more organized way for black youths to participate in tennis. At the time they were excluded from white tennis clubs, but the sport was attracting black athletes in leading Black colleges. The group of men created the American Tennis Association.

The ATA also founded the National Tennis Championships for African Americans, which it now produces annually. Holmes won the men's singles division of the first National Tennis Championship in its first year in 1917 as well as in 1918, 1921, and 1924. In 1920 he was defeated by Jamaican Bertrand Clark. Holmes also competed in men's doubles. He and his partner, Sylvester Smith, won in pairs.

== Links ==
- American Tennis Association - About the American Tennis Association
- International Tennis Hall of Fame – New Exhibit Celebrates Black History – "Breaking the Barriers"
- U.S. Department of Health and Human Services – Office of Minority Health – African American Firsts
