= George VI =

King of the United Kingdom from 1936 to 1952

- Head of the Commonwealth (Note: From April 1949 until his death in 1952.)
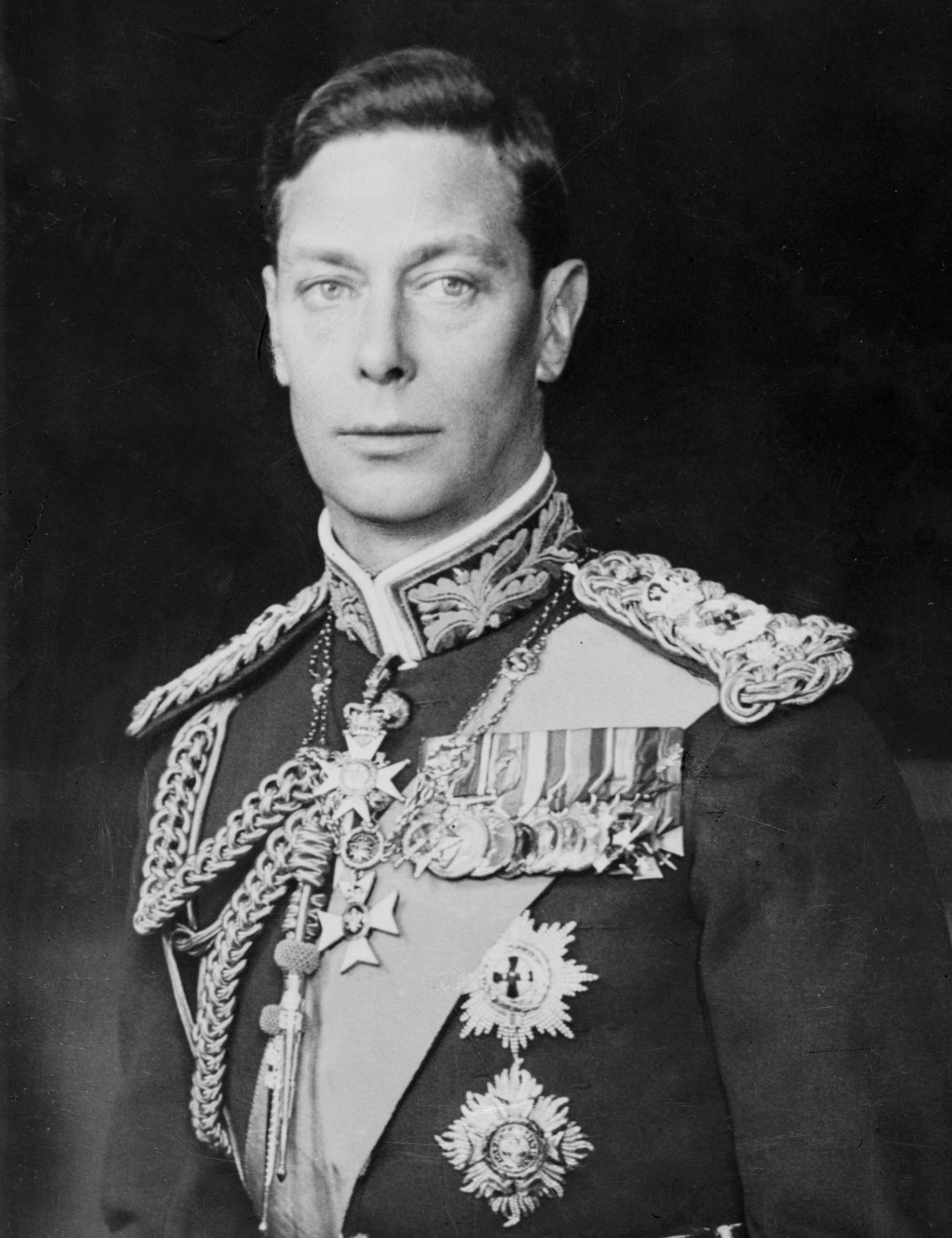
- Formal portrait, 1938

King of the United Kingdom and the British Dominions
- Reign: 11 December 1936 – 6 February 1952
- Coronation: 12 May 1937
- Predecessor: Edward VIII
- Successor: Elizabeth II

Emperor of India
- Reign: 11 December 1936 – 15 August 1947 (Note: George VI continued as titular Emperor of India until 22 June 1948, and remained head of state as King of India until the country became a republic on 26 January 1950. He remained King of Pakistan until his death.)
- Predecessor: Edward VIII
- Successor: Position abolished
- Born: Prince Albert of York; 14 December 1895; York Cottage, Sandringham, Norfolk, England
- Died: 6 February 1952 (aged 56); Sandringham House, Norfolk, England
- Burial: 15 February 1952 Royal Vault, St George's Chapel 26 March 1969 King George VI Memorial Chapel, St George's Chapel
- Spouse: Elizabeth Bowes-Lyon (m. 1923)
- Issue Detail: Elizabeth II; Princess Margaret, Countess of Snowdon
Names
- Albert Frederick Arthur George
- House: Windsor (from 1917); Saxe-Coburg and Gotha (until 1917)
- Father: George V
- Mother: Mary of Teck
- Religion: Protestant (Note: As monarch, George VI was Supreme Governor of the Church of England and a member of the Church of Scotland.)
- Education: Royal Naval College, Osborne; Britannia Royal Naval College
- Military career
- Branch: Royal Navy; Royal Air Force
- Years of active service: 1913–1919
- Conflicts: World War I; Battle of Jutland
- King George VI's voice Speech on Victory in Europe Day; Recorded 8 May 1945

George VI (Albert Frederick Arthur George; 14 December 1895 – 6 February 1952) was King of the United Kingdom and the Dominions of the British Commonwealth from 11 December 1936 until his death in 1952. He was also the last Emperor of India from 1936 until the British Raj was dissolved in August 1947, though the title was only formally relinquished in June 1948. Following the London Declaration of 1949, he was the first Head of the Commonwealth.

The future George VI was born during the reign of his great-grandmother Queen Victoria; he was named Albert at birth after his late great-grandfather Prince Albert of Saxe-Coburg and Gotha and was known as "Bertie" to his family and close friends. His father ascended the throne as George V in 1910. As the second son of the king, Albert was not expected to inherit the throne. He spent his early life in the shadow of his elder brother, Edward, the heir apparent. Albert attended naval college as a teenager and served in the Royal Navy and Royal Air Force during the First World War.

In 1920, he was made Duke of York. He married Lady Elizabeth Bowes-Lyon in 1923, and they had two daughters, Elizabeth and Margaret. In the mid-1920s, he engaged speech therapist Lionel Logue to treat his stutter, which he learned to manage to some degree.

His elder brother ascended the throne as Edward VIII after their father died in 1936, but Edward abdicated later that year to marry the twice-divorced American socialite Wallis Simpson. As heir presumptive to Edward VIII, Albert became king, taking the regnal name George VI. His coronation took place in 1937.

In September 1939, the British Empire and most Commonwealth countries – but not Ireland – declared war on Nazi Germany, following the invasion of Poland. War with the Kingdom of Italy and the Empire of Japan followed in 1940 and 1941, respectively. George VI was seen as sharing the hardships of the common people and his popularity soared. Buckingham Palace was bombed during the Blitz while the King and Queen were there, and his younger brother the Duke of Kent was killed in a plane crash while on active service. George VI became known as a symbol of British determination to win the war. Britain and its allies were victorious in 1945, but the British Empire declined. Ireland had largely broken away, followed by the independence of India and Pakistan in 1947. The King relinquished the title of Emperor of India in June 1948 and instead adopted the new title of Head of the Commonwealth. He was beset by smoking-related health problems in the later years of his reign and died at Sandringham House, aged 56, of a coronary thrombosis. He was succeeded by his elder daughter, Elizabeth II.

== Early life ==
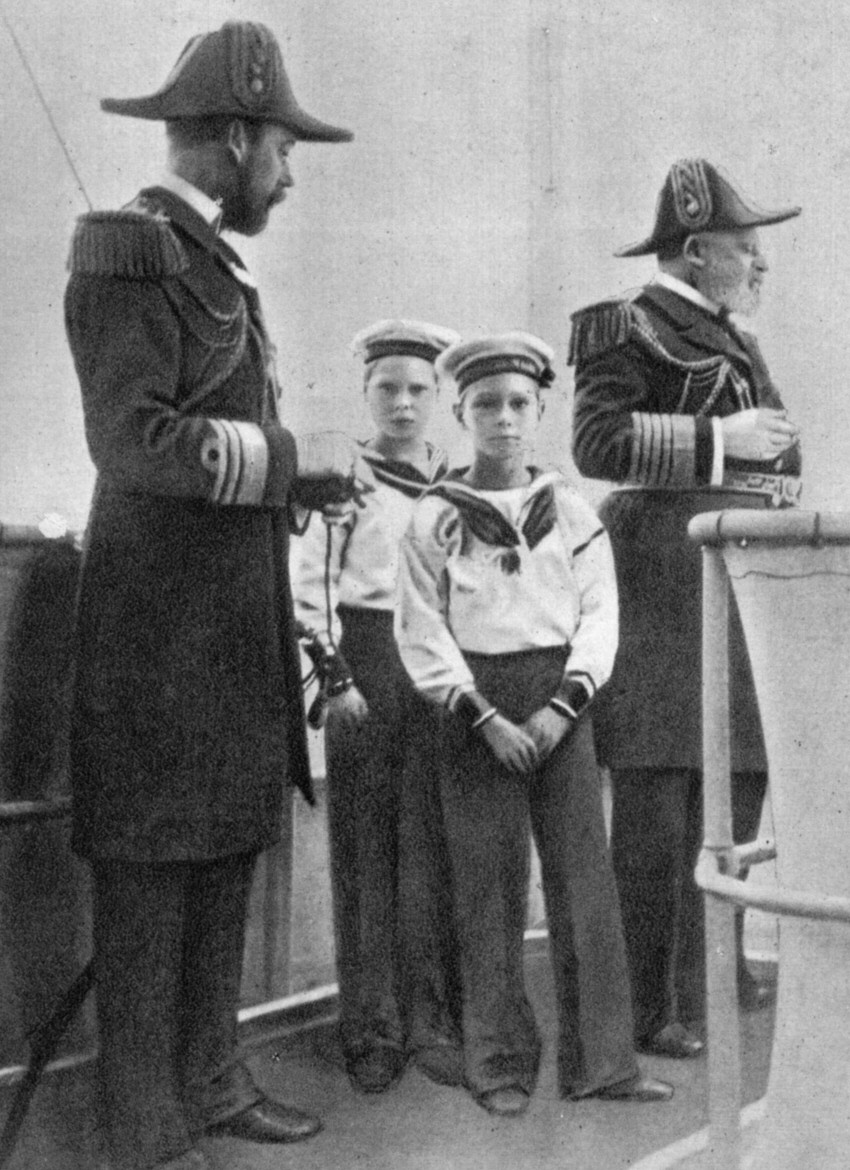
Edward VII (far right); his son George, Prince of Wales, later George V (far left); and grandsons Edward, later Edward VIII (rear); and Albert, later George VI (foreground)

Albert was born at 3:05 am on 14 December 1895 at York Cottage, on the Sandringham Estate in Norfolk, during the reign of his great-grandmother Queen Victoria. His father was Prince George, Duke of York (later King George V), the second and only surviving son of the Prince and Princess of Wales (later King Edward VII and Queen Alexandra). His mother, the Duchess of York (later Queen Mary), was the eldest child and only daughter of Francis, Duke of Teck, and Princess Mary Adelaide, Duchess of Teck. His birth date coincided with the 34th anniversary of the death of his great-grandfather Prince Albert of Saxe-Coburg and Gotha. Uncertain of how the Prince Consort's widow, Queen Victoria, would take the news of the birth, the Prince of Wales wrote to the Duke of York that the Queen had been "rather distressed". Two days later, he wrote again: "I really think it would gratify her if you yourself proposed the name Albert to her."

The Queen was mollified by the proposal to name the new baby Albert, and wrote to the Duchess of York: "I am all impatience to see the new one, born on such a sad day but rather more dear to me, especially as he will be called by that dear name which is a byword for all that is great and good." Consequently, he was baptised "Albert Frederick Arthur George" at St Mary Magdalene Church, Sandringham on 17 February 1896. (Note: His godparents were: Queen Victoria (his great-grandmother, for whom his grandmother the Princess of Wales stood proxy); the Grand Duke and Grand Duchess of Mecklenburg (his maternal great-aunt and great-uncle, for whom his grandfather the Duke of Teck and his paternal aunt Princess Maud of Wales stood proxy); Empress Frederick (his paternal great-aunt, for whom his paternal aunt Princess Victoria of Wales stood proxy); the Crown Prince of Denmark (his great-uncle, for whom his grandfather the Prince of Wales stood proxy); the Duke of Connaught (his great-uncle); the Duchess of Fife (his paternal aunt); and Prince Adolphus of Teck (his maternal uncle).) Formally he was His Highness Prince Albert of York; within the royal family he was known informally as "Bertie". The Duchess of Teck did not like the first name her grandson had been given, and she wrote prophetically that she hoped the last name "may supplant the less favoured one". Albert was fourth in line to the throne at birth, after his grandfather, father and elder brother, Edward.

Albert was ill often and was described as "easily frightened and somewhat prone to tears". His parents were generally removed from their children's day-to-day upbringing, as was the norm in aristocratic families of that era. He had a stutter that lasted for many years. Although naturally left-handed, he was forced to write with his right hand, as was common practice at the time. He had chronic stomach problems as well as knock knees, for which he was forced to wear painful corrective splints.

Queen Victoria died on 22 January 1901, and the Prince of Wales succeeded her as King Edward VII. Albert's father became heir to the throne. In March, Albert's parents embarked on an extensive tour of the British Empire, leaving Albert and his siblings behind in the care of their nannies and their paternal grandparents, Alexandra and Edward VII, who doted on their grandchildren.

== Military career and education ==
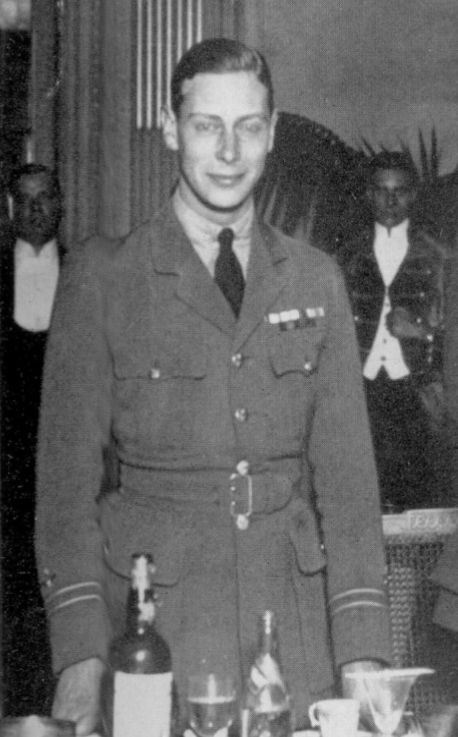
At a Royal Air Force dinner, 1919

Beginning in 1909, Albert attended the Royal Naval College, Osborne, as a naval cadet. In 1911, he came bottom of the class in the final examination, but despite this he progressed to the Royal Naval College, Dartmouth. When his grandfather Edward VII died in 1910, his father became King George V. Prince Edward became Prince of Wales, with Albert second in line to the throne.

Albert spent the first six months of 1913 on the training ship HMS Cumberland in the West Indies and on the east coast of Canada. He was rated as a midshipman aboard HMS Collingwood on 15 September 1913. He spent three months in the Mediterranean, but never overcame his seasickness. Three weeks after the outbreak of World War I he was medically evacuated from the ship to Aberdeen, where his appendix was removed by John Marnoch. He was mentioned in dispatches for his actions as a turret officer aboard Collingwood in the Battle of Jutland (31 May – 1 June 1916), the greatest naval battle of the war. He did not see further combat, largely because of ill health caused by a duodenal ulcer, for which he had an operation in November 1917.

In February 1918, Albert was appointed Officer in Charge of Boys at the Royal Naval Air Service's training establishment at Cranwell. With the establishment of the Royal Air Force Albert transferred from the Royal Navy to the Royal Air Force. He served as Officer Commanding Number 4 Squadron of the Boys' Wing at Cranwell until August 1918, before reporting for duty on the staff of the RAF's Cadet Brigade at St Leonards-on-Sea and then at Shorncliffe. He completed a fortnight's training and took command of a squadron on the Cadet Wing. He was the first member of the British royal family to be certified as a fully qualified pilot.

Albert wanted to serve on the Continent while the war was still in progress and welcomed a posting to General Trenchard's staff in France. On 23 October, he flew across the Channel to Autigny. For the closing weeks of the war, he served on the staff of the RAF's Independent Air Force at its headquarters in Nancy, France. Following the disbanding of the Independent Air Force in November 1918, he remained on the Continent for two months as an RAF staff officer until posted back to Britain. He accompanied King Albert I of Belgium on his triumphal re-entry into Brussels on 22 November. The prince qualified as an RAF pilot on 31 July 1919 and was promoted to squadron leader the following day.

In October 1919, Albert attended Trinity College, Cambridge, where he studied history, economics and civics for a year, with the historian R. V. Laurence as his "official mentor". On 4 June 1920, his father created him Duke of York, Earl of Inverness and Baron Killarney. He began to take on more royal duties. He represented his father and toured coal mines, factories, and railyards. Through such visits he acquired the nickname of the "Industrial Prince". His stutter, and his embarrassment over it, together with a tendency to shyness, caused him to appear less confident in public than his older brother, Edward. However, he was physically active and enjoyed playing tennis. He played at Wimbledon in the Men's Doubles with Louis Greig in 1926, losing in the first round, and is the only member of the royal family to have competed at the Championships. He developed an interest in working conditions, and was president of the Industrial Welfare Society. His series of annual summer camps for boys between 1921 and 1939 brought together boys from different social backgrounds.

== Marriage ==
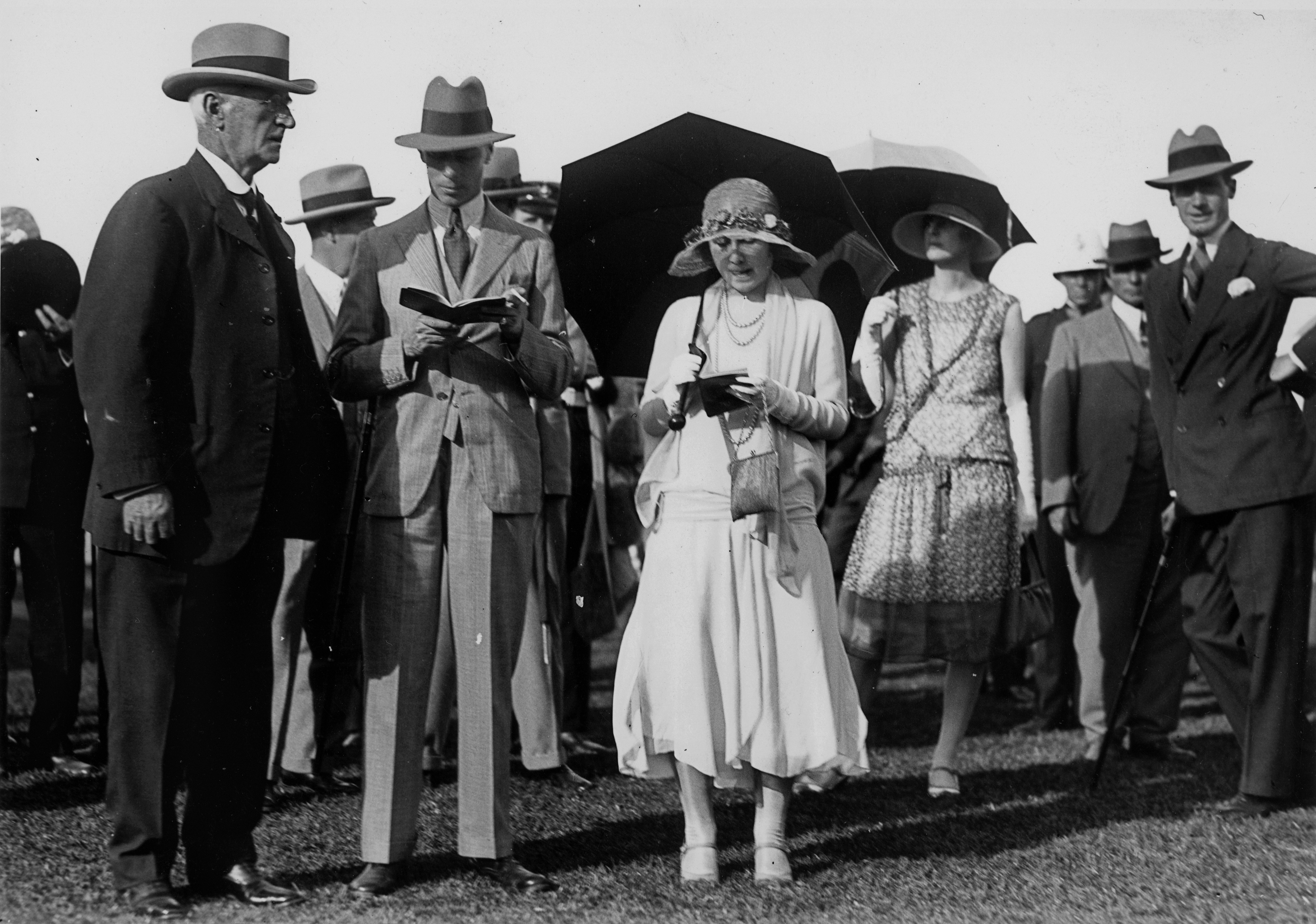
The Duke and Duchess of York (centre, reading programmes) at Eagle Farm Racecourse, Brisbane, Queensland, 1927

In a time when royalty were expected to marry fellow royalty, it was unusual that Albert had a great deal of freedom in choosing a prospective wife. The King brought his son's infatuation with the already-married Australian socialite Lady Loughborough to an end in April 1920 by persuading him to stop seeing her, with the promise of the dukedom of York. That year, Albert met for the first time since childhood Lady Elizabeth Bowes-Lyon, the youngest daughter of the Earl and Countess of Strathmore. He became determined to marry her. Elizabeth rejected his proposal twice, in 1921 and 1922, reportedly because she was reluctant to make the sacrifices necessary to become a member of the royal family. In the words of Lady Strathmore, Albert would be "made or marred" by his choice of wife. After a protracted courtship, Elizabeth agreed to marry him.

Albert and Elizabeth were married on 26 April 1923 at Westminster Abbey. Albert's marriage to someone not of royal birth was considered a modernising gesture. The newly formed British Broadcasting Company wished to record and broadcast the event on radio, but the Abbey Chapter vetoed the idea (although the Dean, Herbert Edward Ryle, was in favour).

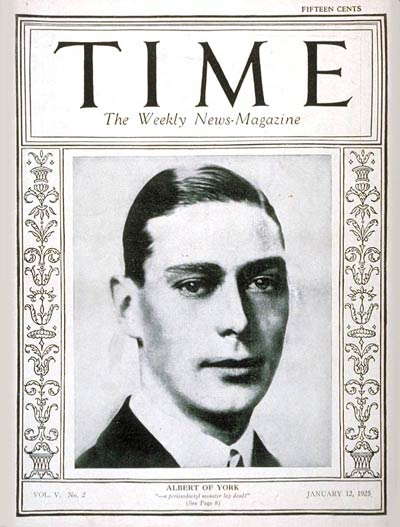
On the cover of Time, January 1925

From December 1924 to April 1925, Albert and Elizabeth toured Kenya, Uganda, and the Sudan, travelling via the Suez Canal and Aden. During the trip, they both went big-game hunting.

Because of his stutter, Albert dreaded public speaking. After his closing speech at the British Empire Exhibition at Wembley on 31 October 1925, one which was an ordeal for both him and his listeners, he began to see Lionel Logue, an Australian-born speech therapist. Albert and Logue practised breathing exercises, and the Duchess rehearsed with him patiently. Subsequently, he was able to speak with less hesitation. With his delivery improved, Albert opened the new Parliament House in Canberra, Australia, during a tour of the empire with his wife in 1927. Their journey by sea (on HMS Renown) to Australia, New Zealand and Fiji took them via Jamaica, where Albert played doubles tennis partnered with a black man, Bertrand Clark, which was unusual at the time and taken locally as a display of equality between races.

Albert and Elizabeth had two children, Elizabeth (called "Lilibet" by the family, later Elizabeth II) in 1926 and Margaret in 1930. The family lived at White Lodge, Richmond Park, and then at 145 Piccadilly, rather than one of the royal palaces. In 1931, the Canadian prime minister, R. B. Bennett, considered Albert for Governor General of Canada – a proposal that King George V rejected on the advice of the Secretary of State for Dominion Affairs, J. H. Thomas.

== Reign ==
=== Reluctant king ===
King George V had severe reservations about Prince Edward, saying "After I am dead, the boy will ruin himself in twelve months" and "I pray God that my eldest son will never marry and that nothing will come between Bertie and Lilibet and the throne." On 20 January 1936, George V died and Edward ascended the throne as King Edward VIII. In the Vigil of the Princes, Prince Albert and his three brothers (the new king; Prince Henry, Duke of Gloucester; and Prince George, Duke of Kent) took a shift standing guard over their father's body as it lay in state, in a closed casket, in Westminster Hall.

As Edward was unmarried and had no children, Albert was the heir presumptive to the throne. Less than a year later, on 11 December 1936, Edward abdicated in order to marry Wallis Simpson, who was divorced from her first husband and divorcing her second. Edward had been advised by British prime minister Stanley Baldwin that he could not remain king and marry a divorced woman with two living ex-husbands. He abdicated and Albert, though he had been reluctant to accept the throne, became king. The day before the abdication, Albert went to London to see his mother, Queen Mary. He wrote in his diary, "When I told her what had happened, I broke down and sobbed like a child."

On the day of Edward's abdication, the Oireachtas, the parliament of the Irish Free State, removed all direct mention of the monarch from the Irish constitution. The next day, it passed the External Relations Act, which gave the monarch limited authority (strictly on the advice of the government) to appoint diplomatic representatives for Ireland and to be involved in the making of foreign treaties. The two acts made the Irish Free State a republic in essence without removing its links to the Commonwealth.

Across Britain, gossip spread that Albert was physically and psychologically incapable of being king. No evidence has been found to support the contemporaneous rumour that the government considered bypassing him, his children and his brother Prince Henry, in favour of their younger brother Prince George. This seems to have been suggested on the grounds that George was at that time the only brother with a son.

=== Early reign ===
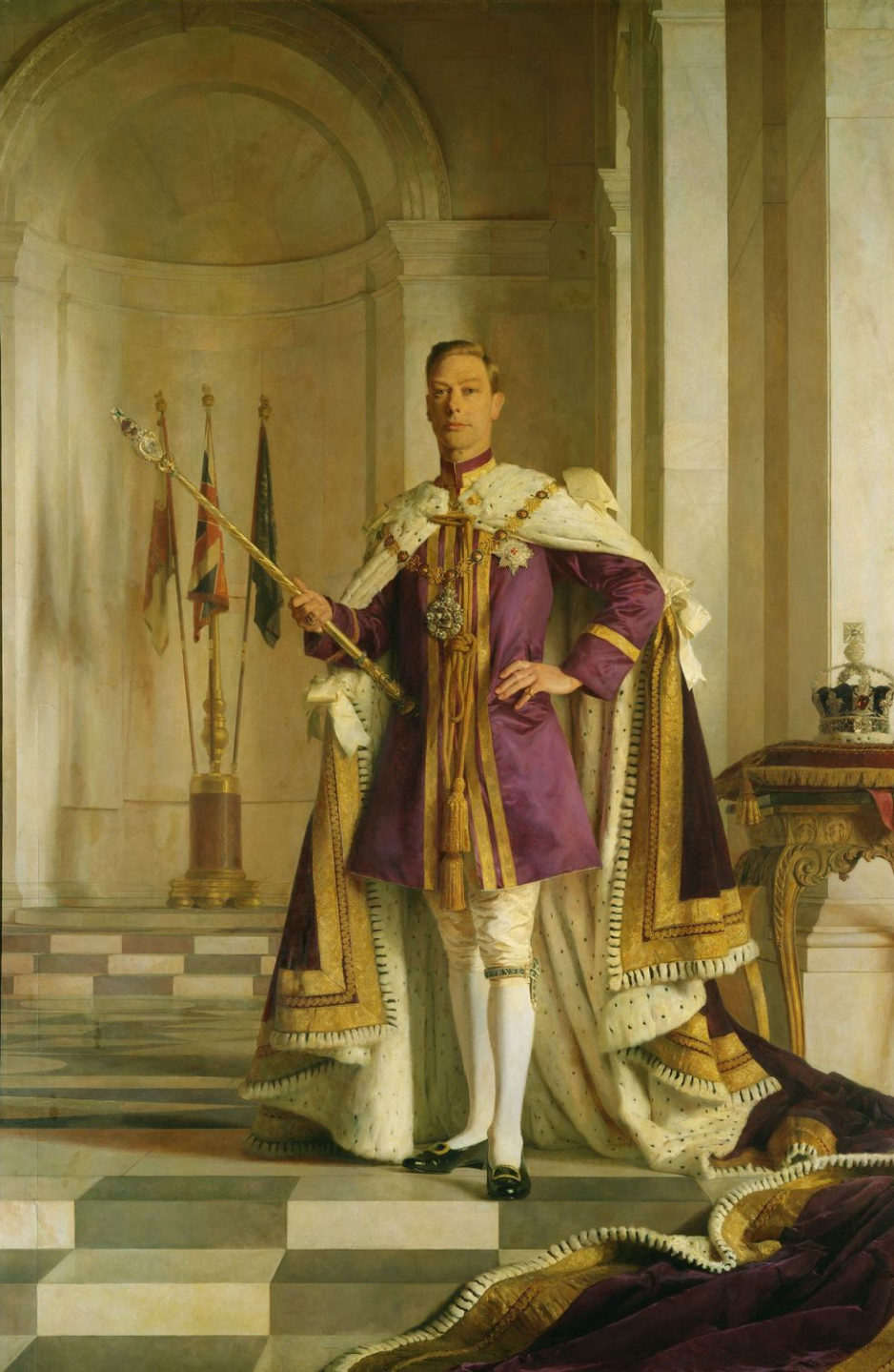
Portrait by Sir Gerald Kelly. The Imperial State Crown is on the right.

Albert assumed the regnal name "George VI" to emphasise continuity with his father and restore confidence in the monarchy. The beginning of George VI's reign was taken up by questions surrounding his predecessor and brother, whose titles, style and position were uncertain. He had been introduced as "His Royal Highness Prince Edward" for the abdication broadcast, but George VI felt that by abdicating and renouncing the succession, Edward had lost the right to bear royal titles, including "Royal Highness". In settling the issue, George's first act as king was to confer upon Edward the title Duke of Windsor with the style "Royal Highness", but the letters patent creating the dukedom prevented any wife or children from bearing royal styles. George VI was forced to buy from Edward the royal residences of Balmoral Castle and Sandringham House, as these were private properties and did not pass to him automatically. Three days after his accession, on his 41st birthday, he invested his wife, the new queen consort, with the Order of the Garter.

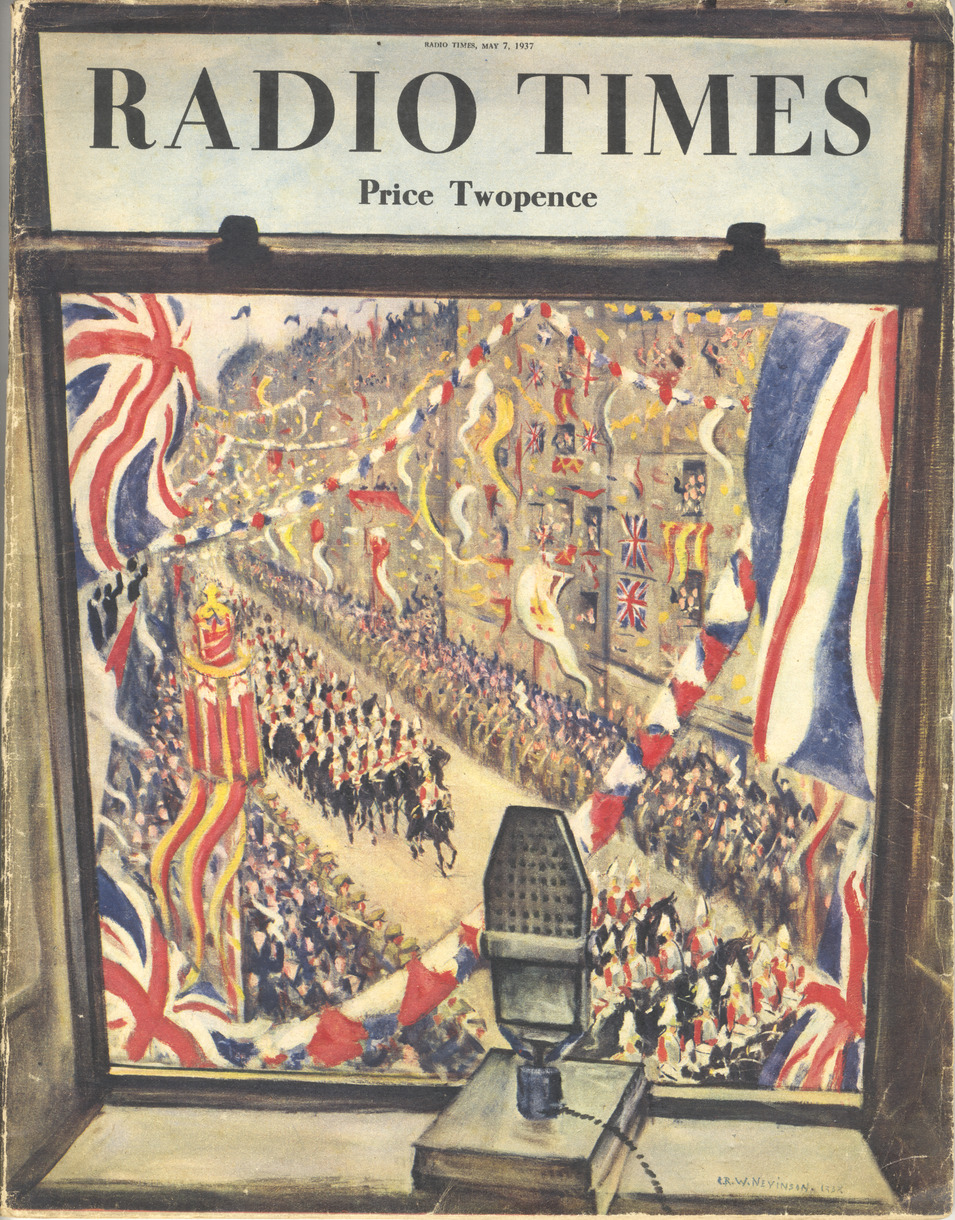
Cover of the 7 May 1937 edition of Radio Times, drawn by C. R. W. Nevinson, marking the first coronation to be broadcast, and partially televised, live

George VI's coronation at Westminster Abbey took place on 12 May 1937, the date previously intended for Edward's coronation. In a break with tradition, Queen Mary attended the ceremony in a show of support for her son. There was no Durbar held in Delhi for George VI, as had occurred for his father, as the cost would have been a burden to the Government of India. Rising Indian nationalism made the welcome that the royal party would have received likely to be muted at best, and a prolonged absence from Britain would have been undesirable in the tense period before the Second World War. Two overseas tours were undertaken, to France and to North America, both of which promised greater strategic advantages in the event of war.

The growing likelihood of war in Europe dominated the early reign of George VI. The King was constitutionally bound to support British prime minister Neville Chamberlain's appeasement of Hitler. When the King and Queen greeted Chamberlain on his return from negotiating the Munich Agreement in 1938, they invited him to appear on the balcony of Buckingham Palace with them. This public association of the monarchy with a politician was exceptional, as balcony appearances were traditionally restricted to the royal family. While broadly popular among the general public, Chamberlain's policy towards Hitler was the subject of some opposition in the House of Commons, which led historian and politician John Grigg to describe the King's behaviour in associating himself so prominently with a politician as "the most unconstitutional act by a British sovereign in the present century".

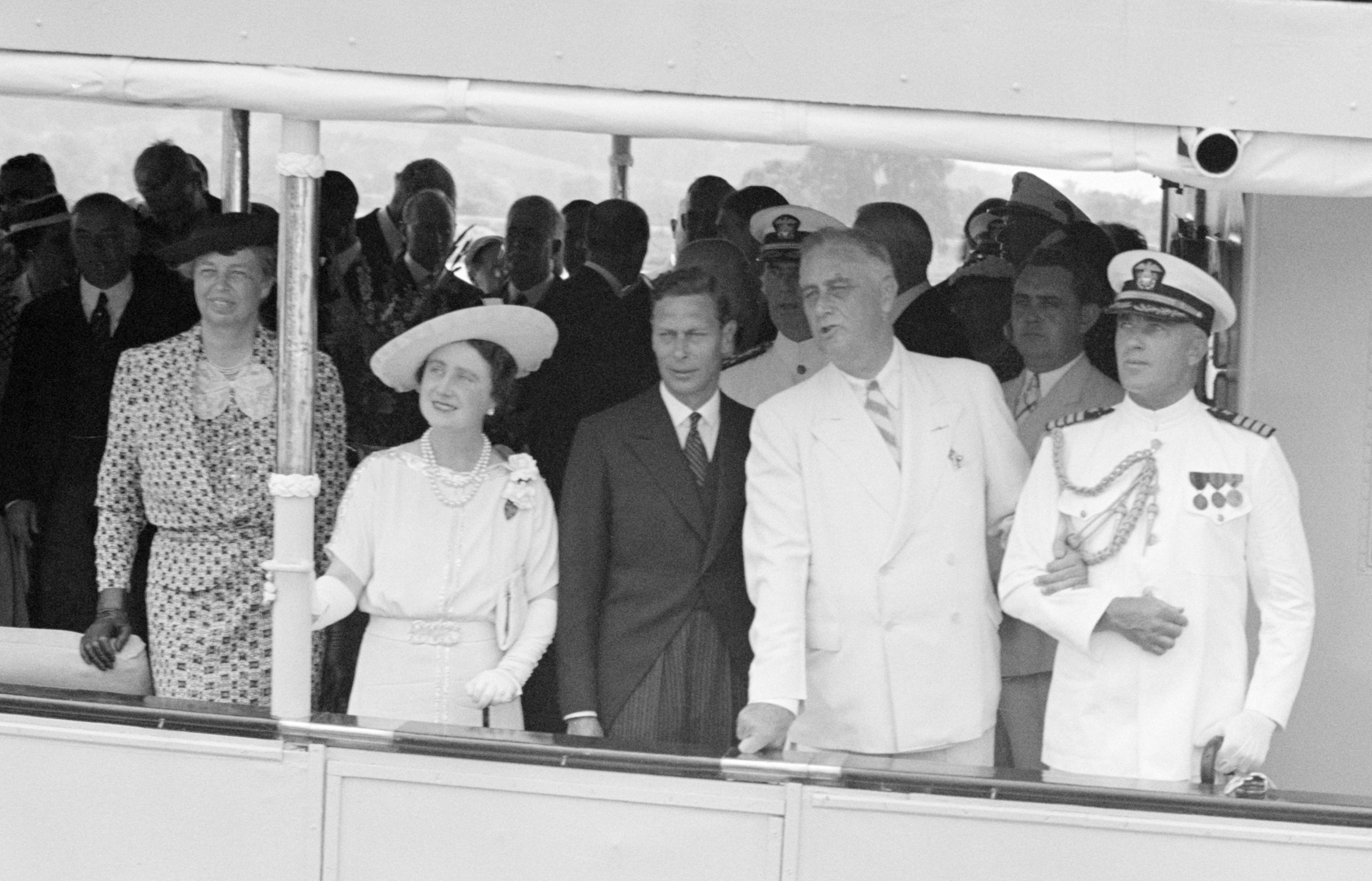
Franklin and Eleanor Roosevelt with King George VI and Queen Elizabeth, on the USS Potomac, 9 June 1939

In May and June 1939, the King and Queen toured Canada and the United States; it was the first visit of a reigning British monarch to North America, although George VI had been to Canada prior to his accession. From Ottawa, the King and Queen were accompanied by Canadian prime minister Mackenzie King, to present themselves in North America as King and Queen of Canada. Both Mackenzie King and the Canadian governor general, Lord Tweedsmuir, hoped that George VI's presence in Canada would demonstrate the principles of the Statute of Westminster 1931, which gave full sovereignty to the British Dominions. On 19 May, the King personally accepted and approved the letter of credence of the new U.S. ambassador to Canada, Daniel Calhoun Roper; gave royal assent to nine parliamentary bills; and ratified two international treaties with the Great Seal of Canada. The official royal tour historian, Gustave Lanctot, wrote "the Statute of Westminster had assumed full reality" and George VI gave a speech emphasising "the free and equal association of the nations of the Commonwealth".

The trip was intended to soften the strong isolationist tendencies among the North American public with regard to the developing tensions in Europe. Although the aim of the tour was mainly political, to shore up Atlantic support for the United Kingdom in any future war, the King and Queen were enthusiastically received by the public. The fear that George VI would be compared unfavourably to Edward VIII was dispelled. The royal couple visited the 1939 New York World's Fair and stayed with President Franklin D. Roosevelt at the White House and at his private estate at Hyde Park, New York. They forged a strong bond of friendship with Roosevelt during the tour, which had major significance in the relations between the United States and the United Kingdom through the ensuing war years.

=== Second World War ===
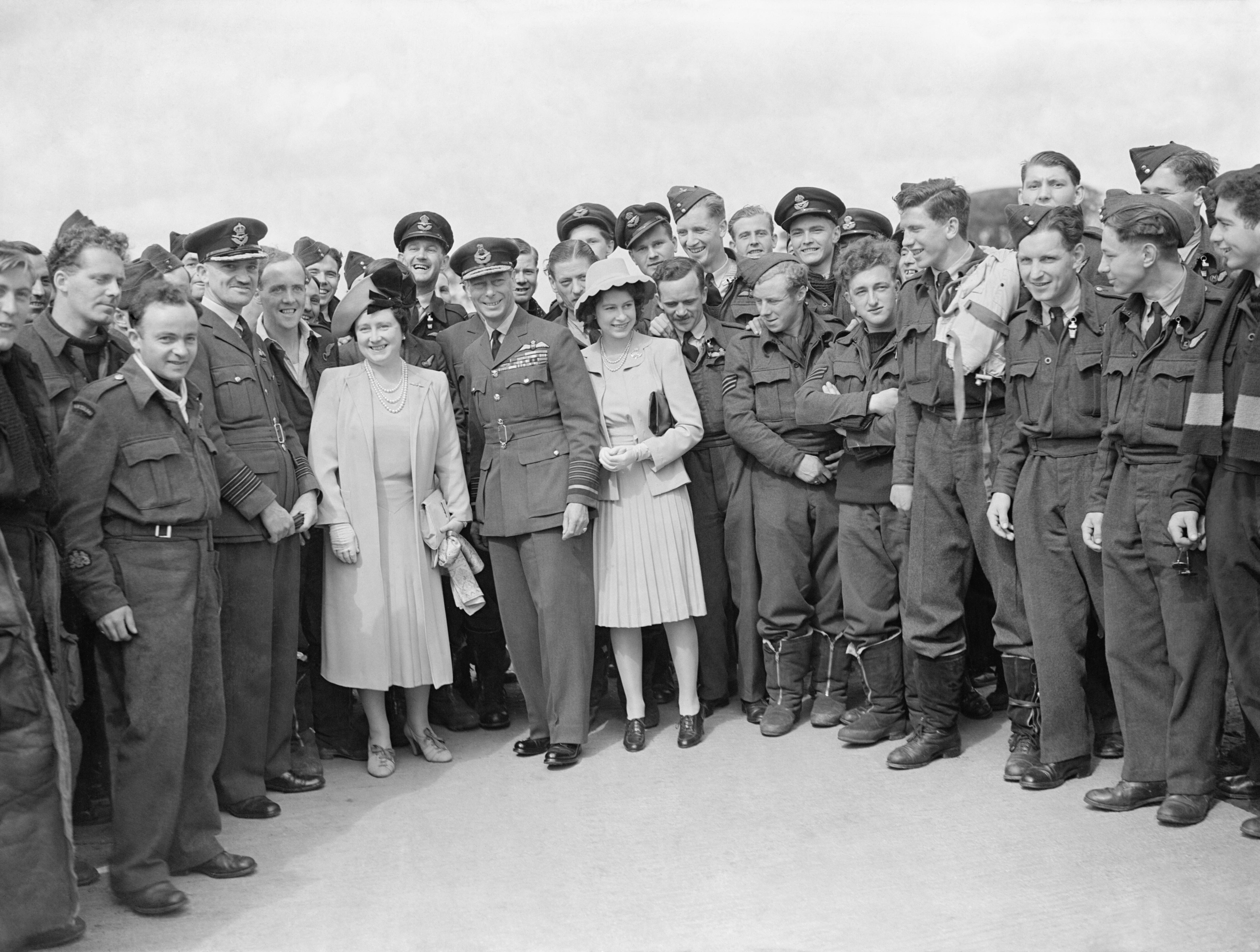
King George VI, Queen Elizabeth, and Princess Elizabeth with RAF personnel during World War II

Following the German invasion of Poland in September 1939, the United Kingdom and the self-governing Dominions other than Ireland declared war on Nazi Germany. The King and Queen resolved to stay in London, despite German bombing raids. They officially stayed in Buckingham Palace throughout the war, although they usually spent nights at Windsor Castle. The first night of the Blitz on London, on 7 September 1940, killed about one thousand civilians, mostly in the East End. On 13 September, the couple narrowly avoided death when two German bombs exploded in a courtyard at Buckingham Palace while they were there. In defiance, the Queen declared: "I am glad we have been bombed. It makes me feel we can look the East End in the face." The royal family were portrayed as sharing the same dangers and deprivations as the rest of the country. They were subject to British rationing restrictions, and the U.S. first lady Eleanor Roosevelt remarked on the rationed food served and the limited bathwater that was permitted during a stay at the unheated and boarded-up Palace. In August 1942, the King's brother, the Duke of Kent, was killed on active service.

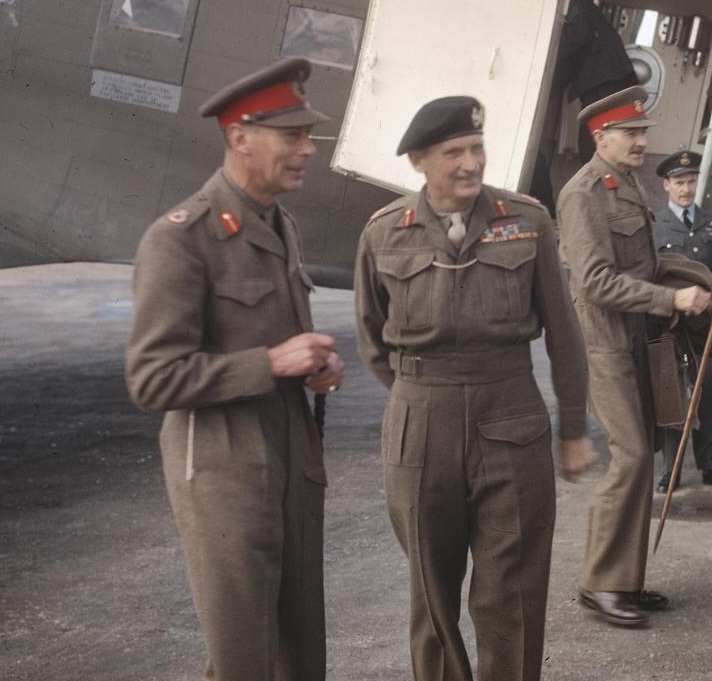
With Field Marshal Bernard Montgomery (right), near the front lines in the Netherlands, October 1944

In 1940, Winston Churchill replaced Neville Chamberlain as prime minister, though personally the King would have preferred to appoint Lord Halifax. After the King's initial dismay over Churchill's appointment of Lord Beaverbrook to the Cabinet, he and Churchill developed "the closest personal relationship in modern British history between a monarch and a Prime Minister". Every Tuesday for four and a half years from September 1940, the two men met privately for lunch to discuss the war in secret and with frankness. George VI related much of what the two discussed in his diary, which is the only extant first-hand account of these conversations.

Throughout the war, George VI and Elizabeth provided morale-boosting visits throughout the United Kingdom, visiting bomb sites, munitions factories, and troops. The King visited military forces abroad in France in December 1939, North Africa and Malta in June 1943, Normandy in June 1944, southern Italy in July 1944, and the Low Countries in October 1944. Their high public profile and apparently indefatigable determination secured their place as symbols of national resistance. At a social function in 1944, the Chief of the Imperial General Staff, Field Marshal Alan Brooke, revealed that every time he met Field Marshal Bernard Montgomery, he thought Montgomery was after his job. The King replied: "You should worry, when I meet him, I always think he's after mine!"

In 1945, crowds shouted "We want the King!" in front of Buckingham Palace during the Victory in Europe Day celebrations. In an echo of Chamberlain's appearance, the King invited Churchill to appear with the royal family on the balcony to public acclaim. In January 1946, George VI addressed the United Nations at its first assembly, which was held in London, and reaffirmed "our faith in the equal rights of men and women and of nations great and small".

=== Empire to Commonwealth ===
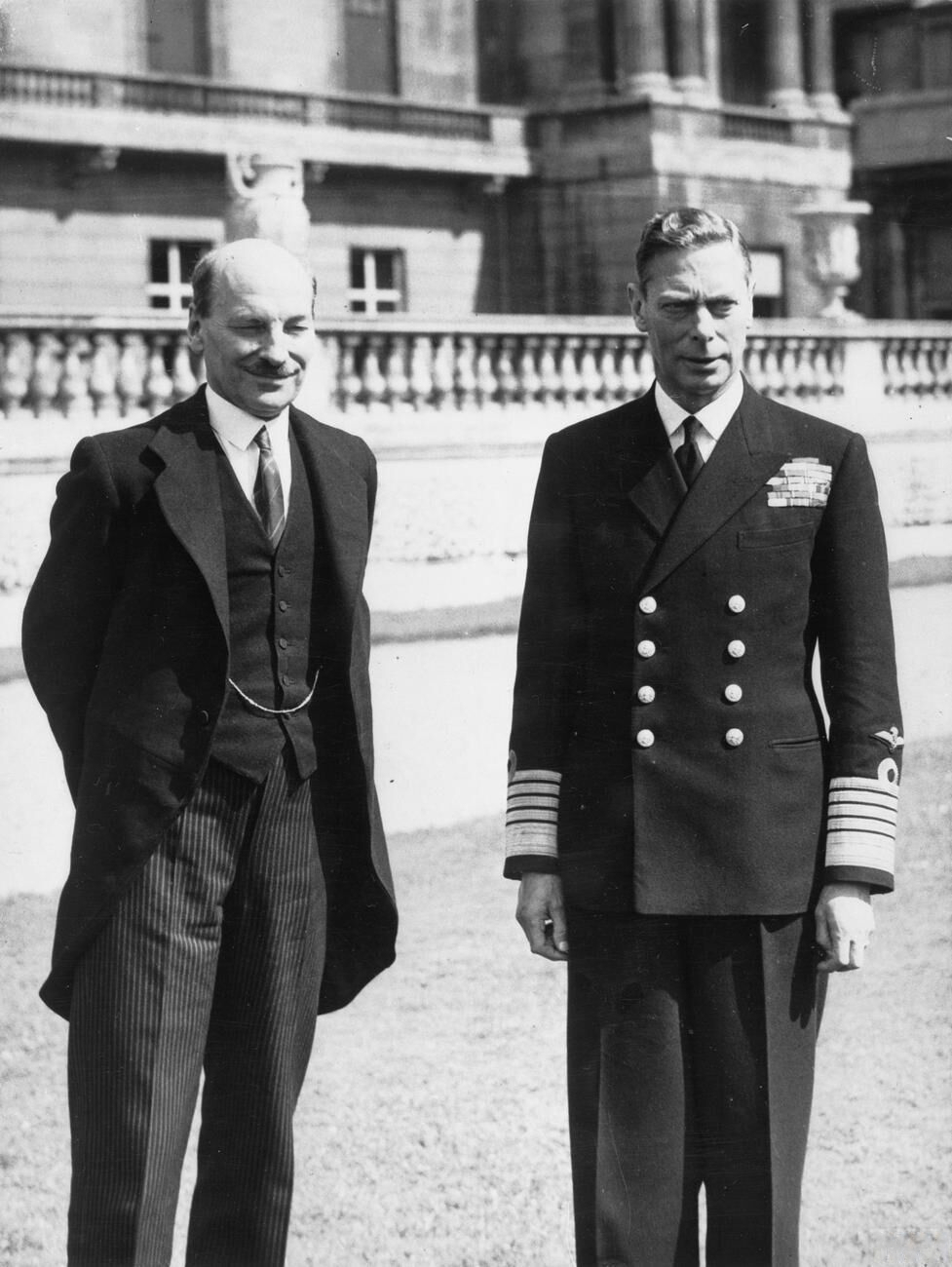
With Clement Attlee (left) at Buckingham Palace, July 1945

George VI's reign saw the acceleration of the dissolution of the British Empire. The Statute of Westminster 1931 had already acknowledged the evolution of the Dominions into separate sovereign states. The process of transformation from an empire to a voluntary association of independent states, known as the Commonwealth, gathered pace after the Second World War. During the ministry of Clement Attlee, British India became the two independent Dominions of India and Pakistan in August 1947. On 22 June 1948, George VI relinquished the title of Emperor of India. In late April 1949, the Commonwealth leaders issued the London Declaration, which laid the foundation of the modern Commonwealth and recognised the King as Head of the Commonwealth. In January 1950, he ceased to be King of India when it became a republic. He remained King of Pakistan until his death. Other countries left the Commonwealth, such as Burma in January 1948, Palestine (divided between Israel and the Arab states) in May 1948 and the Republic of Ireland in 1949.

In 1947, George VI and his family toured southern Africa. The prime minister of the Union of South Africa, Jan Smuts, was facing an election and hoped to make political capital out of the visit. The King was appalled, however, when instructed by the South African government to shake hands only with whites, and referred to his South African bodyguards as "the Gestapo". Despite the tour, Smuts lost the election the following year, and the new government instituted a strict policy of racial segregation.

== Illness and death ==
The stress of the war had taken its toll on George VI's health, made worse by his heavy smoking and subsequent development of lung cancer, as well as other ailments including arteriosclerosis and Buerger's disease. A planned tour of Australia and New Zealand was postponed after he developed an arterial blockage in his right leg, which threatened the loss of the limb and was treated with a right lumbar sympathectomy in March 1949. His elder daughter and heir presumptive, Elizabeth, took on more royal duties as his health deteriorated. The delayed tour was re-organised, with Princess Elizabeth and her husband, Philip, Duke of Edinburgh, taking the place of the King and Queen.

George VI was well enough to open the Festival of Britain in May 1951, but on 4 June it was announced that he would need immediate and complete rest for the next four weeks, despite the arrival of Haakon VII of Norway the following afternoon for an official visit. On 23 September 1951, his left lung was removed in a surgical operation performed by Clement Price Thomas after a malignant tumour was found. In October 1951, Elizabeth and Philip undertook a month-long tour of Canada; the trip had been delayed for a week because of the King's illness. At the State Opening of Parliament in November, the Lord Chancellor, Lord Simonds, read the King's speech from the throne. The King's Christmas broadcast of 1951 was recorded in sections and then edited together.

On 31 January 1952, against the advice of those close to him, the King travelled to London Airport (Note: Renamed Heathrow Airport in 1966.) to see Elizabeth and Philip depart for their tour of Australia via Kenya. It was the last time he was seen in public. Six days later, at 7:30 am on 6 February, he was found dead in bed at Sandringham House in Norfolk. He had died during the night from a coronary thrombosis, aged 56. His daughter, as the new queen, returned to Britain from Kenya immediately after hearing the news.

From 9 February, the King's coffin rested in St Mary Magdalene Church, Sandringham, before lying in state at Westminster Hall from 11 February. His funeral took place at St George's Chapel, Windsor Castle, on 15 February. He was interred initially in the Royal Vault, and was transferred to the King George VI Memorial Chapel inside St George's on 26 March 1969. In 2002, fifty years after his death, the remains of his widow, Queen Elizabeth the Queen Mother, and the ashes of his younger daughter, Princess Margaret, who both died that year, were interred in the chapel alongside him. In 2022, the remains of Queen Elizabeth II and her husband, Prince Philip, were also interred in the chapel.

== Legacy ==
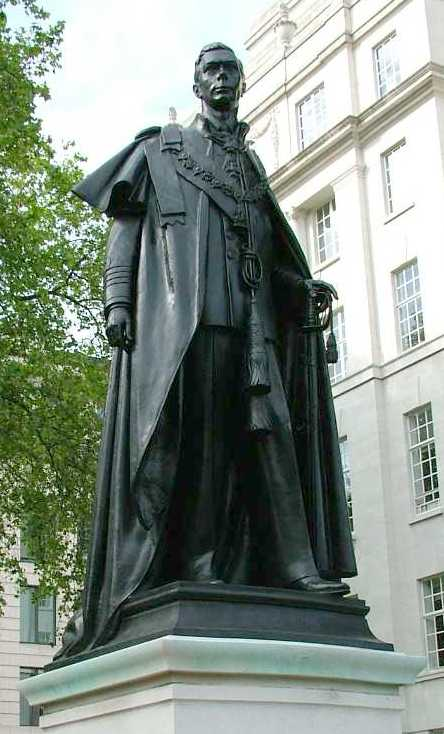
Statue by William McMillan (1955) at Carlton House Terrace, Westminster

In the words of Labour Member of Parliament (MP) George Hardie, the abdication crisis of 1936 did "more for republicanism than fifty years of propaganda". George VI wrote to his brother Edward that in the aftermath of the abdication he had reluctantly assumed "a rocking throne" and tried "to make it steady again". He became king at a point when public faith in the monarchy was at a low ebb. During his reign, his people endured the hardships of war, and imperial power was eroded. However, as a dutiful family man and by showing personal courage, he succeeded in restoring the popularity of the monarchy.

The George Cross and the George Medal were founded at the King's suggestion during the Second World War to recognise acts of exceptional civilian bravery. He bestowed the George Cross on the entire "island fortress of Malta" in 1943. He was posthumously awarded the Order of Liberation by the French government in 1960, one of only two people (the other being Churchill in 1958) to be awarded the medal after 1946.

Colin Firth won an Academy Award for Best Actor for his performance as George VI in the 2010 film The King's Speech.

== Titles, honours and arms ==
As Duke of York, Albert bore the royal arms of the United Kingdom differenced with a label of three points argent, the centre point bearing an anchor azure – a difference earlier awarded to his father, George V, when he was Duke of York, and then later awarded to his grandson Andrew Mountbatten-Windsor, when he was a prince. As king, he bore the royal arms undifferenced.

Coats of arms of George VI

Coat of arms as Duke of York

Coat of arms as King of the United Kingdom

Coat of arms in Scotland

Coat of arms in Canada

== Issue ==
Name	Birth	Death	Marriage		Children
Name	Birth	Death	Date	Spouse	Children
Elizabeth II	21 April 1926	8 September 2022	20 November 1947	Prince Philip, Duke of Edinburgh	Charles III; Anne, Princess Royal; Andrew Mountbatten-Windsor; Prince Edward, Duke of Edinburgh
Princess Margaret, Countess of Snowdon	21 August 1930	9 February 2002	6 May 1960; Divorced 11 July 1978	Antony Armstrong-Jones, 1st Earl of Snowdon	David Armstrong-Jones, 2nd Earl of Snowdon; Lady Sarah Chatto

== Ancestry ==
Ancestors of George VI

8. Prince Albert of Saxe-Coburg and Gotha
4. Edward VII of the United Kingdom
9. Victoria of the United Kingdom
2. George V of the United Kingdom
10. Christian IX of Denmark
5. Princess Alexandra of Denmark
11. Princess Louise of Hesse-Kassel
1. George VI of the United Kingdom
12. Duke Alexander of Württemberg
6. Francis, Duke of Teck
13. Countess Claudine Rhédey von Kis-Rhéde
3. Princess Victoria Mary of Teck
14. Prince Adolphus, Duke of Cambridge
7. Princess Mary Adelaide of Cambridge
15. Princess Augusta of Hesse-Kassel

== Notes ==
George VI House of Windsor Born: 14 December 1895 Died: 6 February 1952
Regnal titles
Preceded by Edward VIII	King of the United Kingdom and the British Dominions; 1936–1952	Succeeded by Elizabeth II
Preceded by Edward VIII	Emperor of India^{1} 1936–1947	Partition of India
Masonic offices
Preceded by Iain Colquhoun	Grand Master Mason of the Grand Lodge of Scotland; 1936–1937	Succeeded by Norman Orr-Ewing
Honorary titles
Preceded by Edward VIII	Air commodore-in-chief of the Auxiliary Air Force; 1936–1952	Succeeded by Elizabeth II
New title	Head of the Commonwealth; 1949–1952	Succeeded by Elizabeth II
New title	Air commodore-in-chief of the Air Training Corps; 1941–1952	Succeeded by The Duke of Edinburgh
Notes and references
1. Indian Empire dissolved 15 August 1947. Title abandoned 22 June 1948 ("No. 38330". The London Gazette. 22 June 1948. p. 3647.)
