= Statue of Lord Trenchard =

Statue in London, England

Coordinates: 51.5035°N 0.1239°W

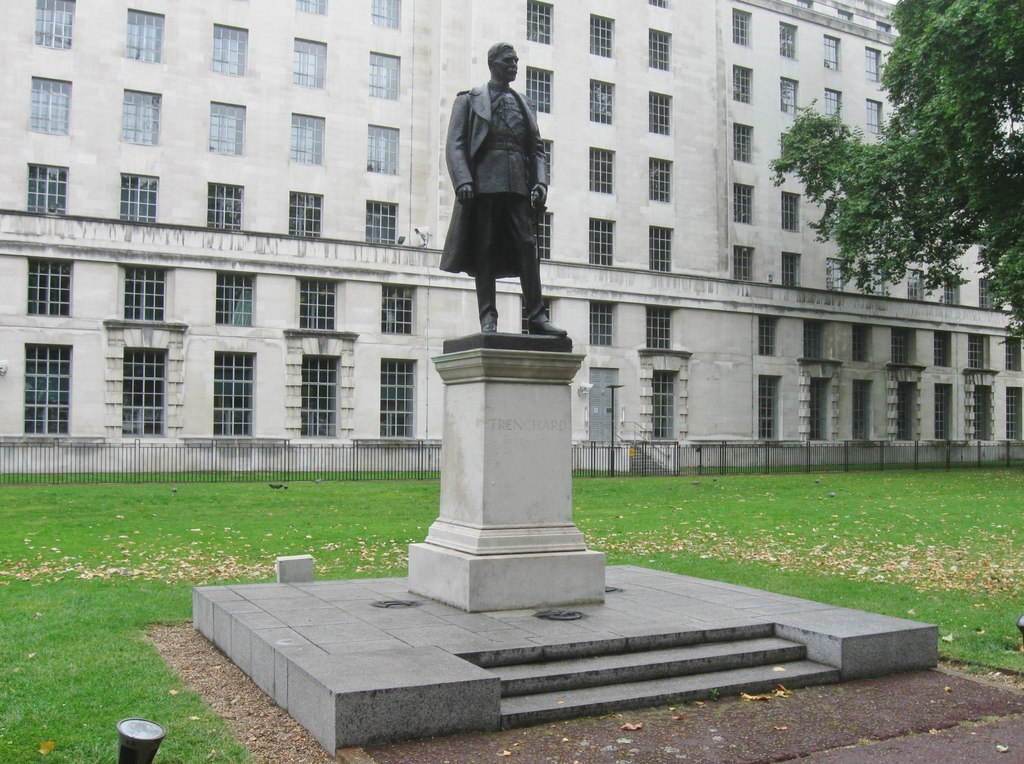
- Artist: William McMillan
- Completion date: 1961
- Subject: Hugh Trenchard, 1st Viscount Trenchard
- Location: London

Listed Building – Grade II
- Official name: Statue of Lord Trenchard
- Designated: 5 February 1970
- Reference no.: 1237902

The statue of Lord Trenchard is a Grade II listed statue in Victoria Embankment Gardens in front of the Ministry of Defence building in London.

The statue was designed by William McMillan and unveiled by Harold Macmillan in 1961. It depicts Hugh Montagu Trenchard, who is often considered to be the "Father of the Royal Air Force", in uniform. Trenchard served under the Royal Flying Corps during the First World War. With the formation of the Royal Air Force in 1918, Trenchard would become the first Chief of the Air Staff.

After working in the air force, Trenchard would also serve as Commissioner of the Metropolitan Police and found Hendon Police College.
