= Statue of George II, Greenwich =

Statue in London, England

Coordinates: 51.4837°N 0.0059°W

George II
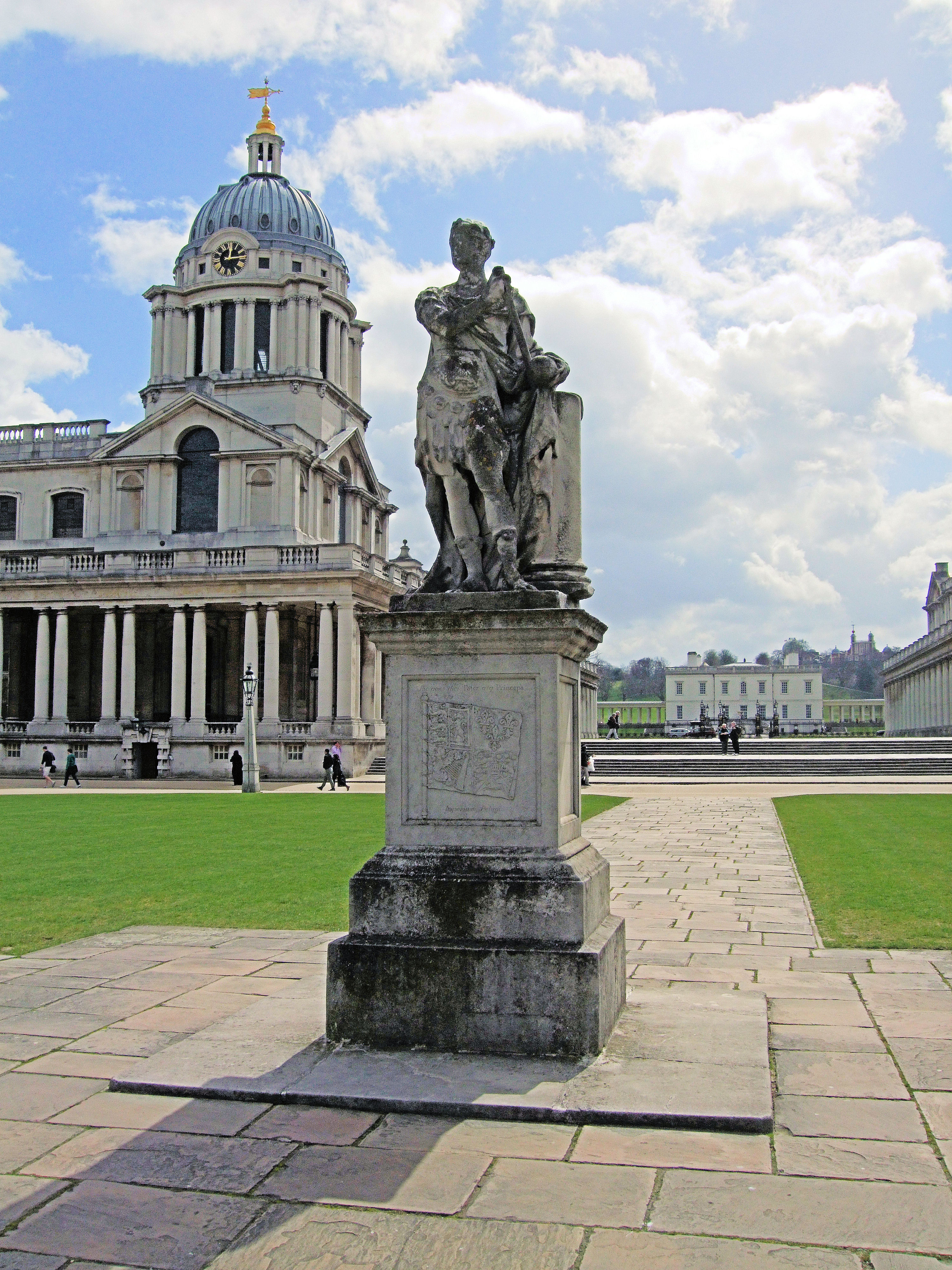
- Artist: John Michael Rysbrack
- Completion date: 1735
- Subject: George II
- Location: London

Listed Building – Grade II
- Official name: Royal Naval College Statue of George II in Centre of Grand Square
- Designated: 8 June 1973
- Reference no.: 1211382

The statue of George II is a marble statue that stands in the centre of an open square within the Old Royal Naval College in Greenwich. The statue was Grade II listed in June 1973.

The marble used to make the statue had been captured from a French ship by George Rooke. It was intended to be used for a statue of Louis XIV before falling into British hands. Greenwich Hospital then acquired the marble in 1714 for the purpose of erecting a statue of William and Mary. Plans changed and a statue of George II was erected by John Jennings in 1735, probably in an attempt to attract the King as a patron for the hospital.

The statue was designed by John Michael Rysbrack and shows the King in Roman attire. George's face is heavily weathered.
