= 61st Battery Royal Field Artillery Boer War Memorial =

War memorial in Woolwich, London

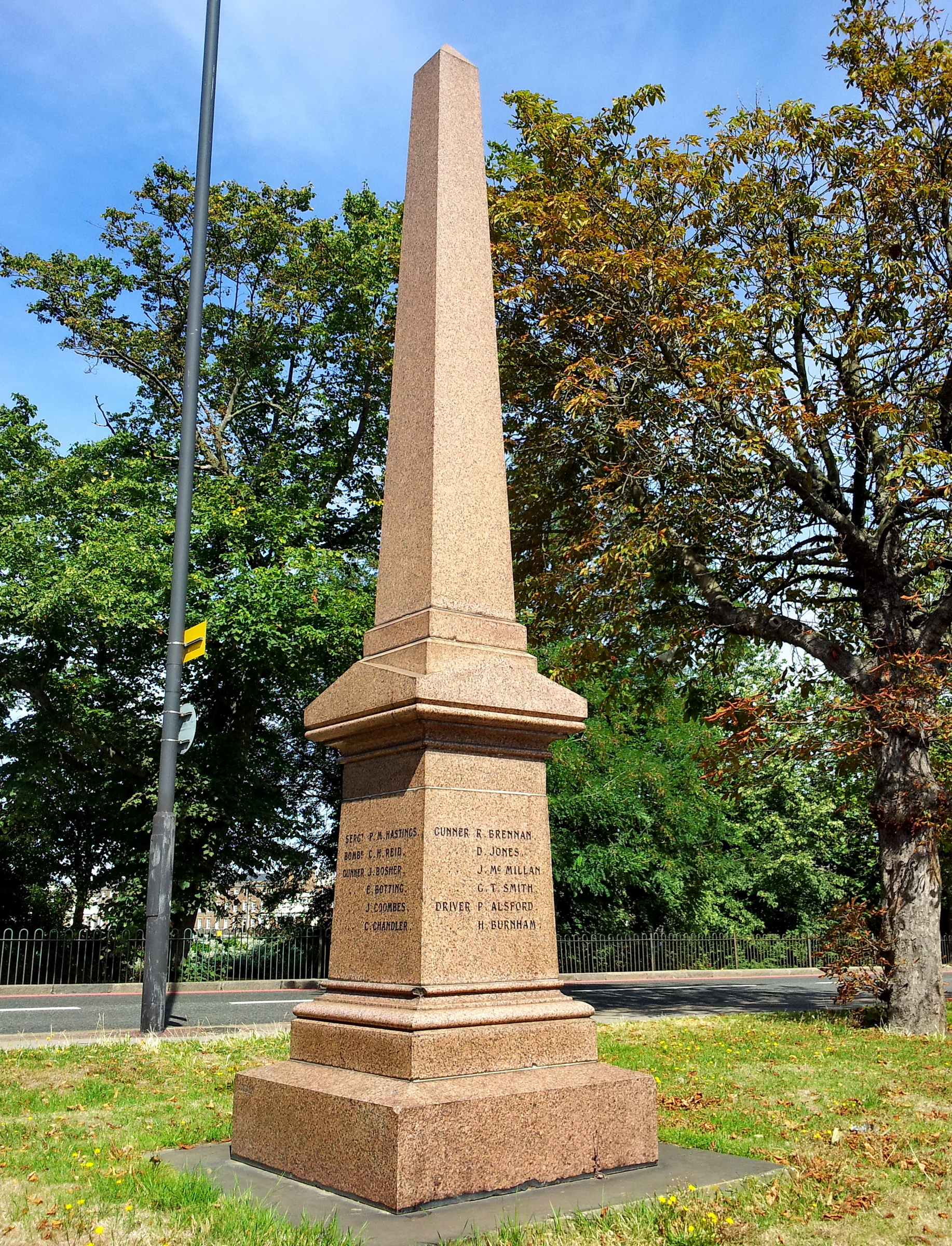
- The memorial in August 2015
- Location: Woolwich, London
- Coordinates: 51°29′03″N 0°03′45″E

The Boer War Memorial in Woolwich is opposite the Royal Artillery Barracks on Grand Depot Road in Woolwich. The memorial marks the deaths of the 18 soldiers of the 61st Battery Royal Field Artillery who died in the Second Boer War. The memorial is a tall thin pink granite obelisk on a square plinth with a three-step base.

The memorial has been Grade II listed on the National Heritage List for England since 1973.
