= Statue of Sir Walter Raleigh =

Statue in Greenwich, London

Coordinates: 51.483082°N 0.008632°W

Sir Walter Raleigh
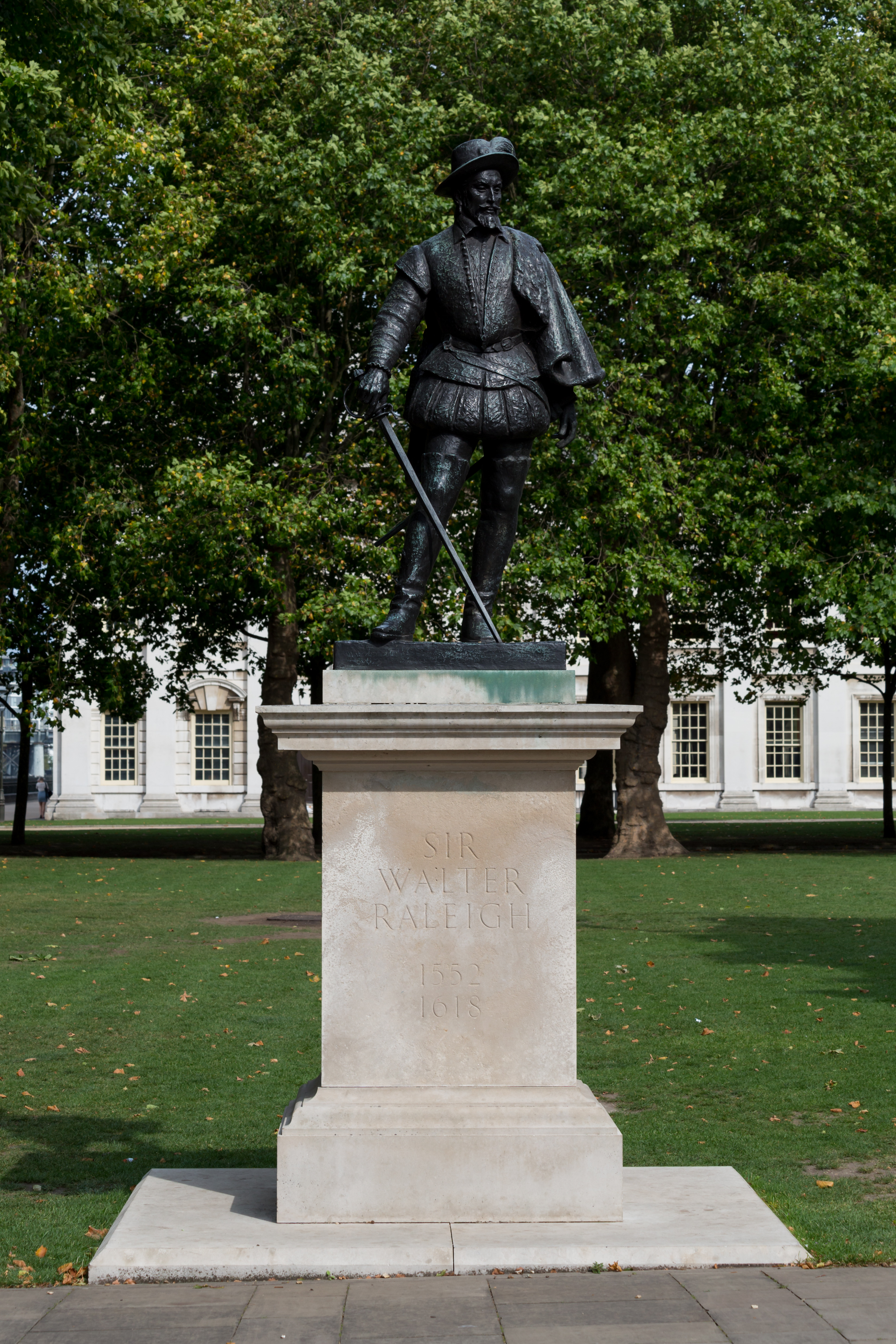
- Artist: William McMillan
- Completion date: 1959
- Subject: Sir Walter Raleigh
- Location: London

Listed Building – Grade II
- Official name: Statue of Sir Walter Raleigh
- Designated: 05 February 1970
- Reference no.: 1224167

A statue of Sir Walter Raleigh, by William McMillan stands in the grounds of the Old Royal Naval College in Greenwich, London. Originally standing in Whitehall, it was moved to its current location in 2002. The statue is Grade II listed.

== Background ==
The statue of Walter Raleigh, an explorer who was deeply involved in the exploration and later colonisation of America, was commissioned to mark the 350th anniversary of the establishment of the Virginia colony, the first permanent British colony in the Americas. Funds were raised by John Dodge, an American-born British colonel and chairmen of the Ends of the Earth Club. The English Speaking Union assisted in gathering funding.

The statue was originally unveiled on Whitehall in front of the Ministry of Defence in 1959 by the American ambassador, John Hay Whitney. It was moved in October 2001 to Greenwich. Although its original site on Whitehall now houses a statue of Lord Alanbroke, it retains the name Raleigh Green.

There was some controversy surrounding Raleigh at his unveiling, as he is well known for his role in popularising tobacco in Britain.

== Description ==
The statue is of bronze upon a Portland stone plinth. It depicts Raleigh standing with a sword. Slung over his left shoulder is a cloak, in reference to the time Raleigh supposedly laid it in front of Queen Elizabeth I so that she would not have to step in a puddle.
