= Deus Lunus statue, Royal Arsenal =

Roman sculpture in London

Deus Lunus
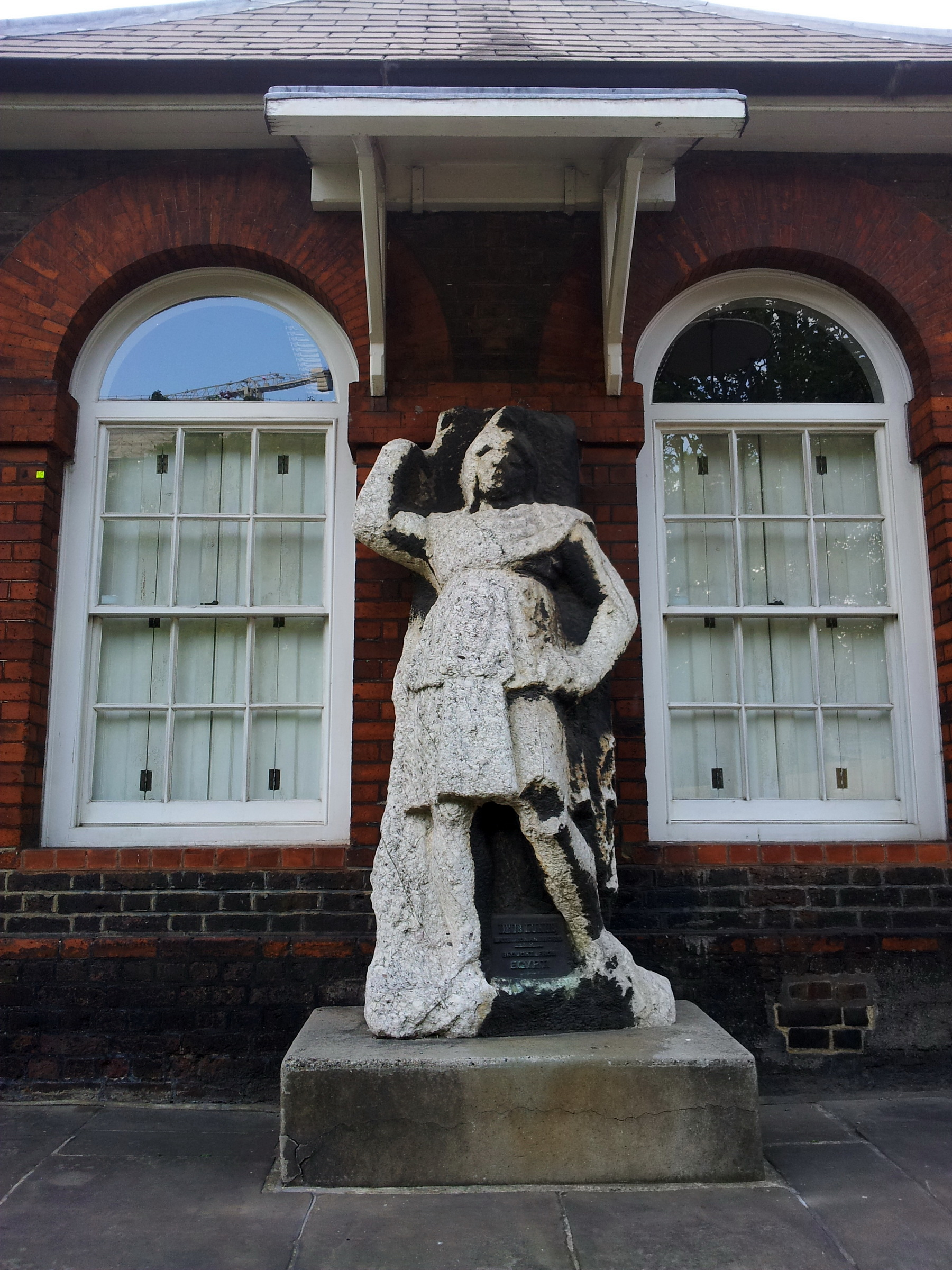
- Year: First to Third Century CE
- Medium: marble
- Dimensions: 240 cm (96 in)
- Location: London; 51.4923°N 0.0694°E

The Deus Lunus (Moon God) statue, actually depicting a barbarian, is a late Roman sculpture which was found by British troops in 1801 at Alexandria, Egypt and brought to the UK in September 1802. The statue is today situated at the Royal Arsenal Brass Foundry building at the Royal Arsenal, Woolwich, London.

== Original location at Alexandria ==
A study made in 1998 by British Museum Roman and Hellenistic specialist Donald Bailey (1931–2014) speculated that the statue may have originated from a monument in a necropolis or possibly from a public building in the eastern Alexandrian suburb of Nicopolis or the district of Alexandrian Eleusis.

The statue would have originally been one of a pair of figures likely supporting an architectural feature, with a now-missing companion figure mirroring the pose of the extant sculpture.

== Circumstances in which the statue was found in 1801 ==
From March to September 1801, British forces laid siege to the city of Alexandria which was then in possession of the French. During this period the Deus Lunus statue was dug up by the 3rd Regiment of Guards (later known as the Scots Guards) while making entrenchments at their camp east of Alexandria. The sculpture was initially placed by Colonel Hilgrove Turner in the British defensive lines: it is shown standing in the desert an engraving made in 1802 by William Alexander (after Colonel Turner) which depicts the topography of Alexandria and the British and French positions.

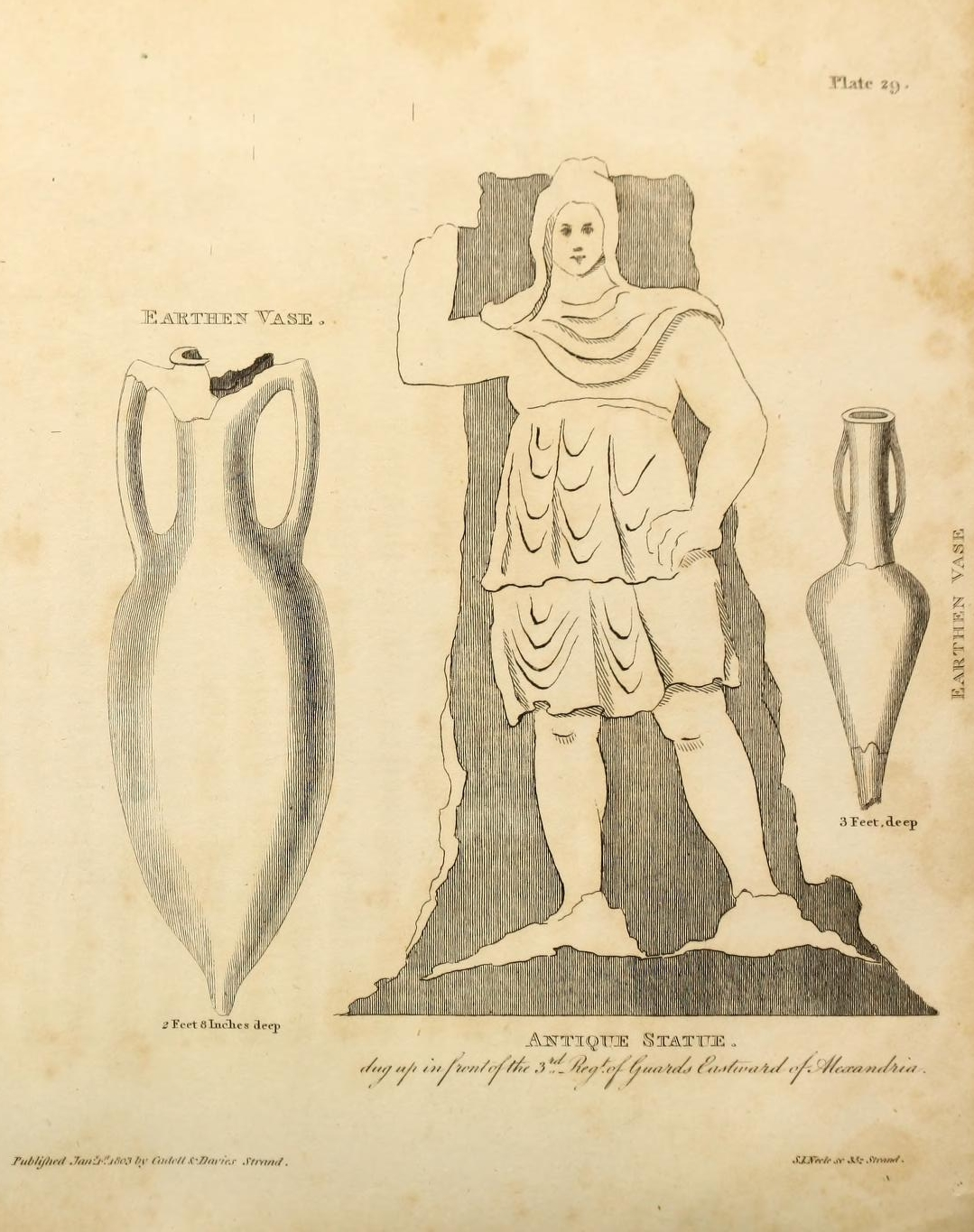
"Antique Statue," an 1803 engraving by S.J. Neele, showing the Deus Lunus Roman Barbarian statue soon after it was discovered.

An engraving by Samuel John Neele from Thomas Walsh's Journal of the Late Campaign in Egypt shows a depiction of the statue as it appeared shortly after it was first found.

After the capitulation of the French forces in September 1801 ancient Egyptian sculptures that had been in possession of the French, famously including the Rosetta Stone, were ceded to the British. It is believed that the Deus Lunus statue was brought to Britain alongside the consignment of Egyptian artefacts.

== Rediscovery of the statue in more recent years ==
The status of the statue was uncertain for many years and it was only known from artist impressions. Donald Bailey, with the help of other researchers, later deduced that the statue had been stored at the Royal Arsenal Laboratory after its arrival in Britain but that the work had fallen into obscurity after building work at the Royal Arsenal in the 1850s. The Barbarian spent a period buried in rubbish before being rescued and redisplayed in the 1870s; outside exposure to London's pollution in the 19th and 20th centuries has greatly eroded its features. The site where the statue now stands was closed to the public until 1994, when the Ministry of Defence mainly vacated the Royal Arsenal site, and the statue became more accessible to researchers. Coincidentally, archaeological work has indicated that a Roman settlement existed near the site of the Royal Arsenal, with a Roman cemetery once on the site of the Arsenal itself.
