= Elliott Wood Partnership =

UK company

- Type: Limited Liability Partnership
- Industry: Consulting structural and civil engineers
- Founded: 1994 by Gary Elliott and Paul Wood
- Owners: Partners: Gary Elliott, Paul Wood, David Morgan, Andy Downey
- Website: www.elliottwood.co.uk

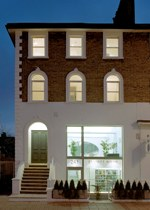
Elliott Wood Partnership, London Office

Elliott Wood Partnership is a structural and civil engineering practice, located in South West London, Central London and Nottingham, England, with approximately 140 staff based between these three offices.

== Activities ==
The practice has approximately 140 staff working from offices located in Wimbledon, a Central London office and Nottingham. The practice was founded in 1994 by Gary Elliott and Paul Wood.

The work undertaken includes large scale residential developments, commercial, healthcare, hotels, education, leisure / cultural buildings, regeneration and retail schemes throughout the UK and overseas. The practice has experience in the conservation of historic buildings and remedial and refurbishment work is undertaken. Complex and structurally demanding specialist projects have been carried out including sculptures and glass structures. Projects have won architectural and industry awards including four projects which received 2012 RIBA awards and a 2011 Manser Medal for 3a Hampstead Lane. Projects are undertaken for developers and contractors as well as public bodies, including local authorities and NHS trusts.

== Awards ==
Elliott Wood has worked on many projects which have received architectural and industry awards. Most recently these include Bushey Cemetery & Prayer Halls in 2018, winning two RIBA Awards (National & East). Two projects in 2013 received RIBA awards and four projects in 2012, including a Manser Medal in 2011 for 3a Hampstead Lane, a 1960s residential property designed and built by architects Stirling and Margaret Craig, in the ‘Brutalist’ style. Another project to have received awards is the Kentish Town Health Centre which was the inspiration of Architects Allford Hall Monaghan Morris. This project won a 2009 RIBA Award and a Design Award in the 2009 Lift Awards. It was also shortlisted for the RIBA Stirling Prize.
