= William McMillan (sculptor) =

British sculptor

- Born: 31 August 1887; Aberdeen, Scotland
- Died: 25 September 1977 (aged 90); Richmond, London, England
- Education: Gray's School of Art; Royal College of Art
- Known for: Sculpture

William McMillan RA (31 August 1887 – 25 September 1977) was a Scottish sculptor, notable for a number of public statues in the United Kingdom.

== Biography ==
McMillan was born at 37 Powis Place, Aberdeen, Scotland, the son of William McMillan, a master engraver, and Jane Knight. He studied at Gray's School of Art in Aberdeen and then at the Royal College of Art in London from 1908 to 1912, under Édouard Lantéri. McMillan joined The Artists Rifles in World War I, and served as an officer in the 5th Oxfordshire and Buckinghamshire Light Infantry during the conflict. In 1916, he married Dorothy, daughter of the Carlisle architect Maurice Charles Williams. They had no children.

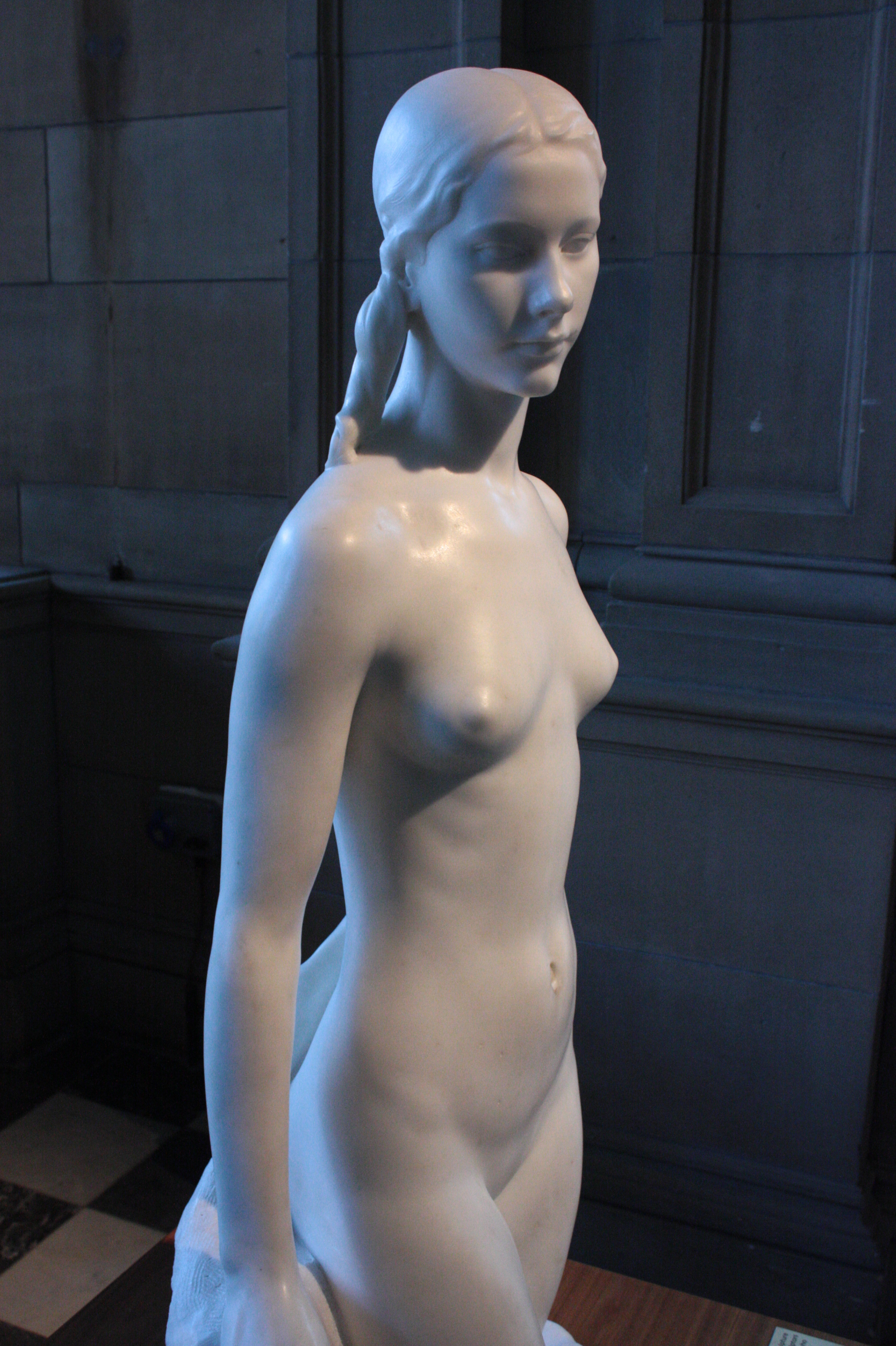
Syrinx, 1925

In 1919 McMillan was awarded a commission by the British Government to design the artwork for the British Armed Forces World War I campaign medals, to be issued to all personnel who had seen active service in theatres of war during the conflict. For the Victory campaign medal he created a design utilizing a relief engraving of the classical Greek goddess Nike, with the text THE GREAT WAR FOR CIVILISATION 1914–1919; and for the British War Medal he sculpted a relief in Greek Classical style of Saint George upon a horse trampling the emblems of the defeated German Empire. This would be the most prolific artwork of his career, with almost twelve million of these medals being issued in combination within the United Kingdom and across the globe throughout the British Empire.

McMillan exhibited at the Royal Academy in London from 1917 until 1971. He was elected an associate of the Academy in 1925, a full member in 1933 and a Senior RA in 1962. From 1929 to 1941 he was Master of the Royal Academy Sculpture School.

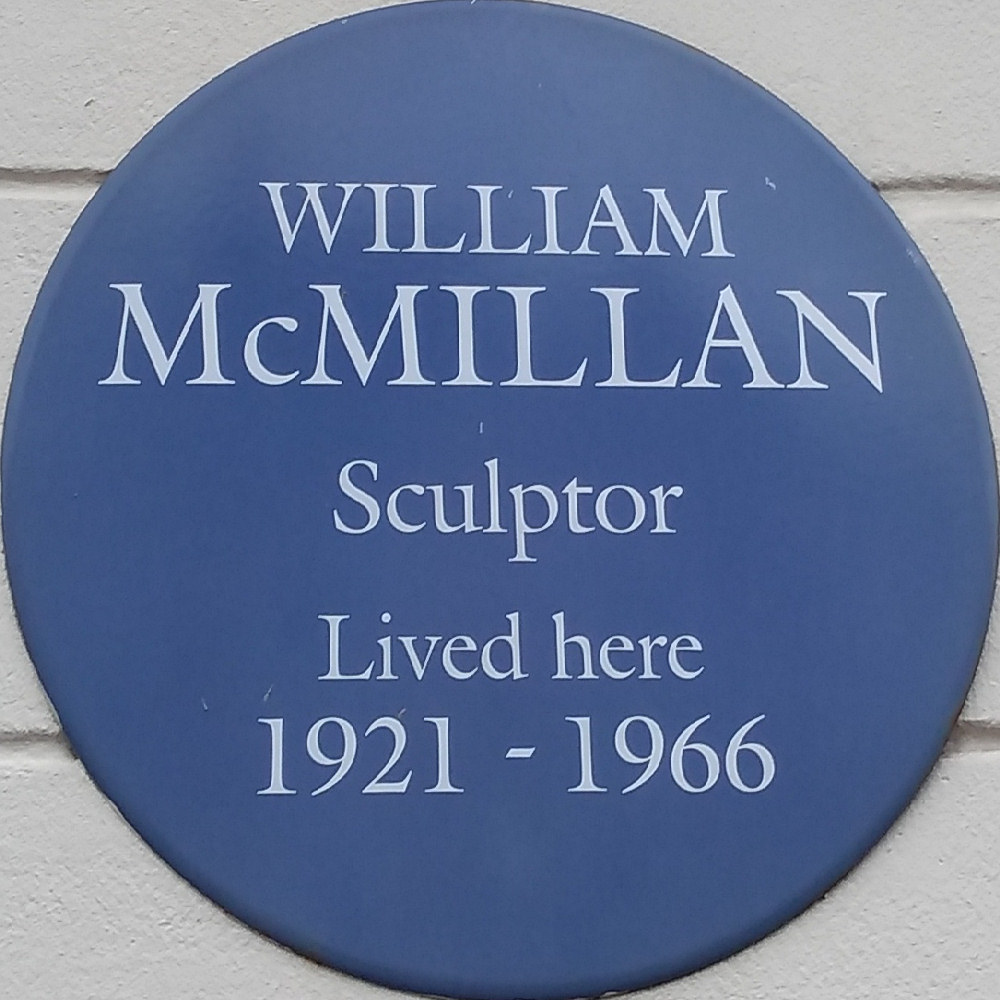
Glebe Place

From 1940 to 1966 McMillan became involved in a number of important and prestigious public commissions, and became more widely recognised at international level. He was made a Commander of the Royal Victorian Order (CVO) in 1956. His home city of Aberdeen made him a Freeman of the City and Aberdeen University conferred an honorary doctorate upon him.

For most of his career he had a studio at Glebe Place in Chelsea, London, and was a member of the Chelsea Arts Club. A faux blue plaque exists at 63 Glebe Place, stating "William McMillan lived here". Even if this were the correct address, Glebe Place was his place of work not residence. In his later years he lived at 3 Cholmondley Walk, Richmond, London. Shortly after his 90th birthday in September 1977 he was assaulted and robbed. He died of his injuries on 25 September 1977 in a hospital in Richmond upon Thames. He was buried at Richmond Cemetery.

== Selected works ==
=== 1920-1939 ===
Image	Title / subject	Location and coordinates	Date	Type	Material	Dimensions	Designation	Wikidata	Notes
	War memorial	Echt, Aberdeenshire	1921	Statue on pedestal	Bronze and granite				
More images	War memorial	Exterior of Cowdray Hall, Aberdeen	1925	Lion sculpture on pedestal	Granite		Category A	Q4666883	Architects: Alexander Marshall Mackenzie & Alexander George Robertson Mackenzie
	Bishop Hugh Oldham	Manchester Grammar School	1931	Statue	Bronze				McMillan also created Youth, a 1931 war memorial for the School.
	Earl Haig	Clifton College, Bristol	Cast 1931; unveiled 1932	Statue	Bronze		Grade II	Q26586264	
	Frederick Craufurd Goodenough	Goodenough College, Mecklenburgh Square, London	1936	Bust in niche	Bronze		Grade II		Architect, Herbert Baker.
	Thomas Coram	Foundling Museum, Brunswick Square, London	c. 1937	Bust in pediment	Stone		Grade II		Architect, J. M. Shepherd.

=== 1940-1949 ===
Image	Title / subject	Location and coordinates	Date	Type	Material	Dimensions	Designation	Wikidata	Notes
More images	David Beatty, 1st Earl Beatty	Trafalgar Square, London	1948	Bust	Bronze		Grade II*	Q29295271	
	Nereid and Triton with Dolphins, the Beatty Memorial Fountain	Trafalgar Square, London	1948	Two sculpture groups in fountain	Bronze		Grade II*	Q29295257	Architect, Edwin Lutyens.

=== 1950-1959 ===
Image	Title / subject	Location and coordinates	Date	Type	Material	Dimensions	Designation	Wikidata	Notes
More images	Triton and Dryads Fountain	Queen Mary's Gardens, Regent's Park, London	Designed 1936, erected 1950	Fountain with sculpture group	Bronze and stone		Grade II	Q26656400	Memorial to Sigismund Goetze.
More images	Extension to Chatham Naval Memorial	Chatham, Kent	1952	Sculpture elements	Portland stone		Grade I	Q5087681	Extension designed by Sir Edward Maufe with other elements executed by Charles Wheeler.
More images	Extension to Portsmouth Naval Memorial	Portsmouth	1953	Sculpture elements	Portland stone		Grade I	Q20712306	Extension designed by Sir Edward Maufe with other elements by Charles Wheeler and Esmond Burton.
	Alcock and Brown	Brooklands Museum	1954	Sculpture group					Formerly located at Heathrow Airport
More images	Additions to Plymouth Naval Memorial	Plymouth Hoe	1954	Two sculpture groups	Bronze		Grade I	Q7205840	Extension designed by Sir Edward Maufe with other elements by Charles Wheeler.
More images	Memorial to George VI	Carlton House Terrace, London	1955	Statue on pedestal	Bronze and Portland stone			Q18577910	
More images	Statue of Sir Walter Raleigh	Old Royal Naval College, Greenwich, London	1959	Statue on pedestal	Bronze and stone		Grade II	Q27080893	Relocated from Whitehall in 2001.

=== 1960 and later ===
Image	Title / subject	Location and coordinates	Date	Type	Material	Dimensions	Designation	Wikidata	Notes
	Genius, lion and unicorn figures	Kensington Central Library	1960	Sculptures	Gilded bronze and stone		Grade II*		
	William Caxton and Geoffrey Chaucer	Kensington Central Library	1960	Deep relief busts	Stone		Grade II*		
More images	Statue of Hugh Trenchard, 1st Viscount Trenchard	Victoria Embankment Gardens, London	1961	Statue on pedestal	Bronze and Portland stone		Grade II	Q27081636	
More images	Statue of Thomas Coram	Outside the Foundling Museum, Brunswick Square, London	1963	Seated statue on pedestal	Bronze and granite		Grade II	Q27083559	

=== Other works ===
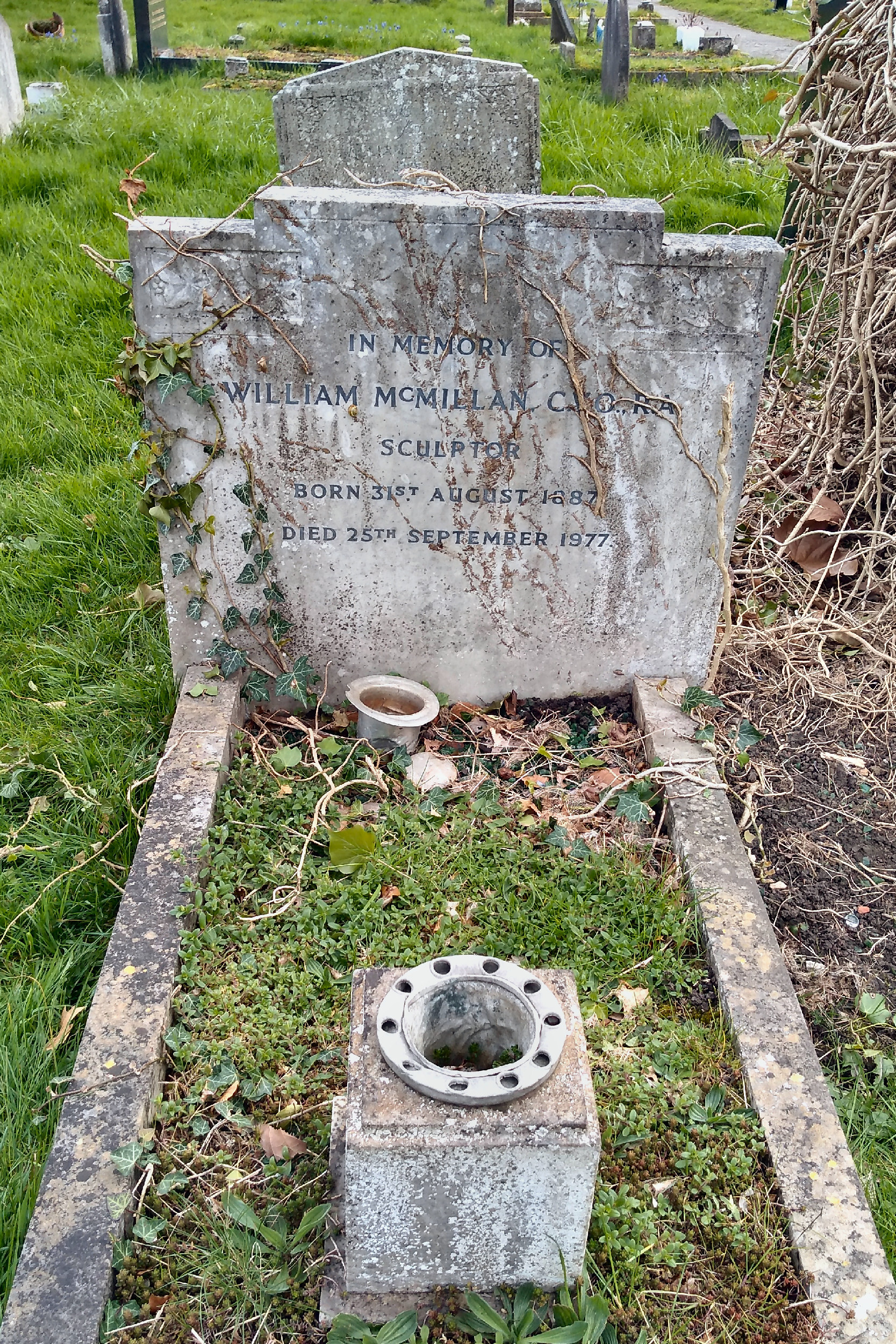
McMillan's grave in Richmond Cemetery

- The Invocation, 1910
- Commissioned to design both the "British War Medal" and "Victory Medal", 1919
- Bust of A. G. Macdonnell, author, 1923
- Syrinx, Kelvingrove Art Gallery, Glasgow, 1925
- Tam O’Shanter, 1926
- Statuette in green slate, 1927
- Memorial plaque to Sir Aston Webb, 1930, St Paul's Cathedral, London
- Dancer, 1931
- The Birth of Venus, marble, Tate Gallery, 1931
- Statue of J. M. W. Turner, commissioned by the Royal Academy, 1936
- The Naked Truth, 1936
- Mother and Child, 1938
- King George V, 1938, bronze statue, originally erected in Eden Gardens, Kolkata and moved to Barrackpore during the 1970s
