= Lulu (name) =

Lulu is a feminine given name. Originally a diminutive of the name Luise in German, it is now also used as a given name in its own right.

== Given name ==
- Lulu (singer) (born 1948), Scottish singer
- Lulu Al-Obaid (born 2004), Saudi footballer
- Lulu Antariksa (born 1995), American actress and singer
- Lulu Ballard (1908–1981), American tennis player
- Lulu Basinyi (born 1976), Botswana sprinter
- Lulu Rowena Becker (1883–1963), American missionary, translator
- Lulu Benstead (1891–1983), Australian opera singer
- Lulu Brud (born 1985), American actress and interior designer
- Lulu Kunkel Burg (1876–1953), American violinist
- Lulu Carter (born 1961), Swedish author and TV presenter
- Chen Lulu (born 1997), Chinese cyclist
- Lulu Vere Childers (1870–1946), American music educator
- Lulu Craig (1867–1971), Homesteader, historian and educator
- Lulu Delacre (born 1957), Puerto Rican writer
- Lulu Devine (born 1955), American actress
- Lulu Dikana (1978–2014), South African singer
- Lulu Flores (born 1955), American politician
- Lulu Odell Gaiser (1896–1965), Canadian botanist and educator
- Lulu Garcia-Navarro (born 1970/71), American journalist
- Lulu Glaser (1874–1958), American actress
- Lulu Grace Graves (1874–1949), American dietitian
- Lulu Gribbin (born 2008), American shark attack survivor and advocate
- Lulu Guinness (born 1960), British fashion designer
- Lulu Haangala (born 1984), Zambian TV personality
- Lulu Haddon (1881–1964), American politician
- Hao Lulu (born 1979), Chinese cosmetic surgery recipient
- Lulu Hassan, Kenyan journalist, news anchor and television producer
- Lulu M. Hefner (1874–1954), Cherokee businessperson
- Lulu Huang Lu Zi Yin (born 1991), Taiwanese television host, singer and actress
- Lulu Hurst (1869–1950), American stage magician
- Lulu James, British-Tanzanian singer
- Lulu Jarvis (born 2004), English footballer
- Lulu Johnson (historian) (1907–1995), American historian and university administrator
- Lulu Johnson (politician) (born 1964), South African politician
- Lulu Mae Johnson (1877–1918), Canadian dance-hall performer and hotelier
- Lulu Kang, Chinese-American data scientist and statistician
- Lulu Kennedy (born 1969), UK based fashion designer and magazine editor
- Lulu Latsky (1901–1980), South African writer and zoologist
- Lulu Luscious, American drag performer
- Lulu McClatchy, Australian actress, singer and comedian
- Lulu McConnell (1882–1962), American actress
- Lulu Miller (born 1983), American writer and journalist
- Lulu Bell Parr (1876–1960), Wild West performer
- Lulu Hunt Peters (1873–1930), American physician
- Lulu Pinkus, Australian actress and screenwriter
- Lulu Platt (1863–1934), suffragist and first woman to run for a seat in the North Carolina Senate
- Lulu Popplewell (born 1991), British actress
- Lulu Porter (fl. 1960s), American actress and singer
- Lulu Pullar (born 1998), Australian rules football and association football player
- Lulu Qian, Chinese-American biochemist and academic
- Lulu Ranne (born 1971), Finnish politician
- Lulu Rasebotsa, Botswana corporate executive
- Lulu Roman (1946–2025), American comedian, singer and author
- Lulu Santos (born 1953), stage name of Brazilian singer and guitarist, real name Luiz Maurício Pragana dos Santos
- Lulu King Saxon (1852–1927), American painter
- Lulu Schwartz (born 1948), American Sufi journalist and writer
- Lulu Shorter (1887–1989), Australian designer
- Lulu Statia (born 1997), Curaçaoan footballer
- Lulu G. Stillman (c.1881–1969), Advocate for Native Americans
- Lulu Sun (born 2001), New Zealand and Swiss professional tennis player
- Lulu Tenney (born 2001), American fashion model
- Lulu von Thürheim (1788–1864), Austrian painter and memoirist
- Lulu von Strauss und Torney (1873–1956), German writer and poet
- Lulu Valli (1886–1964), British actress
- Lulu Wang (filmmaker) (born 1983), American filmmaker
- Lulu Wang (novelist) (born 1960), Chinese-born writer
- Lulu Wang (engineer), New Zealand biomedical engineer
- Lulu Chow Wang, American businesswoman and philanthropist
- Lulu Wei, Canadian filmmaker
- Lulu White (c. 1868 – 1931), American brothel madam
- Lulu Belle Madison White (1900–1957), American civil rights activist
- Lulu Wilson (born 2005), American actress
- Lulu Xuan (born 1991), Chinese actress
- Lulu Zaharani (born 2003), Indonesian beauty pageant titleholder
- Zheng Lulu (born 1987), Chinese track cyclist
- Zhou Lulu (born 1988), Chinese weightlifter
- Lulu Ziegler (1903–1973), Danish actress, singer and theatre director

== Nickname ==
- Abu Lulu, Sudanese military commander and war criminal
- Lulu Reinhardt (1951–2014), French gypsy jazz guitarist
- Lulu Santos (born 1953), Brazilian musician and singer

== Surname ==
- Anolyn Lulu (born 1979), Vanuatuan table tennis player
- Omar Lulu (born 1984), Indian filmmaker
- Sakaes Lulu, Vanuatuan politician
- Sani Lulu (born 1958), Nigerian football executive

== Fictional characters ==
- Lulu, a character in the "Lulu" plays
- Lulu (Final Fantasy), a character in the Final Fantasy video game series
- LuLu the Piggy, a featured pig elf character invented by Chinese designer Cici
- Lulu Spencer, a character in the soap opera General Hospital

== See also ==
- Lulu (disambiguation)
- Lu'lu', Arabic given name
- Lu Lu (badminton) (born 1990), Chinese badminton player
- Li Xiaolu or Lu Lu (born 1982), Chinese actress
