= All-time tennis records – Women's singles =

This article covers the period 1884 to present. Before the beginning of the Open era in April 1968, only amateurs were allowed to compete in established tennis tournaments, including the four Grand Slams. Wimbledon, the oldest of the majors, was founded in 1877, followed by the US Open in 1881, the French Open in 1891, and the Australian Open in 1905. Beginning in 1905 and continuing to the present day, all four majors have been played yearly, with the exception of the two World Wars, 1986 for the Australian Open, and 2020 for Wimbledon. The Australian Open is the first major of the year (January), followed by the French Open (May–June), Wimbledon (June–July), and US Open (August–September).

There was no prize money and players were compensated for travel expenses only. A player who wins all four current major tournaments in the same calendar year, as an individual or as part of a doubles team, is said to have achieved the "Grand Slam". If the player wins all four consecutively, but not in the same calendar year, it is called a "Non-Calendar Year Grand Slam". Winning all four at some point in a career, even if not consecutively, is referred to as a "Career Grand Slam". Winning the four majors and a gold medal in tennis at the Summer Olympics has been called a "Golden Slam" since 1988. Winning all four plus gold at some point in a career, even if not consecutively, is referred to as a "Career Golden Slam". Winning the Year-end Championship also having won a Golden Slam is referred to as a "Super Slam". Winning the four majors in all three disciplines a player is eligible for–singles, doubles, and mixed doubles–is considered winning a "boxed set" of Grand Slam titles.

The current Grand Slams are the four most prestigious tournaments in the world held every year, they are distinguished by participation from almost every top player and by their two-week duration, 128-player draw in women's singles. It's extremely rare for a player to win all four tournaments, "the Grand Slam", in one calendar year. This was only achieved three times since 1888 by Maureen Connolly, Margaret Court, and Steffi Graf, the latter of whom stands alone in winning the "Golden Slam". These are some of the important records since the start of women's tennis in 1884. Most statistics are based on the data at the WTA Tour and International Tennis Federation, the official websites of each respective Grand Slam tournament and published sources though this is not a definitive list due to the time periods involved. Active streaks and active players are in boldface.

== Grand Slam tournament records ==
=== Grand Slam singles totals ===
#	Titles
24	Margaret Court
23	Serena Williams
22	Steffi Graf
19	Helen Wills
18	Chris Evert
18	/ Martina Navratilova
12	Billie Jean King
9	Maureen Connolly
9	// Monica Seles
8	/ Molla Mallory
8	Suzanne Lenglen

#	Finals
34	Chris Evert
33	Serena Williams
32	/ Martina Navratilova
31	Steffi Graf
29	Margaret Court
22	Helen Wills
18	Doris Hart
18	Billie Jean King
18	Evonne Goolagong Cawley
16	Helen Jacobs
16	Venus Williams

#	Semifinals
52	Chris Evert
44	/ Martina Navratilova
40	Serena Williams
37	Steffi Graf
36	Margaret Court
26	Doris Hart
26	Billie Jean King
25	Louise Brough
24	Helen Jacobs
23	Venus Williams

#	Quarterfinals
54	Chris Evert
54	Serena Williams
53	/ Martina Navratilova
43	Margaret Court
42	Steffi Graf
40	Billie Jean King
39	Venus Williams
35	Arantxa Sánchez Vicario
32	Doris Hart
31	Helen Jacobs
31	// Monica Seles
31	Lindsay Davenport

#	Match wins
367	Serena Williams
306	/ Martina Navratilova
299	Chris Evert
278	Steffi Graf
271	Venus Williams
210	Arantxa Sánchez Vicario
207	Margaret Court
198	Lindsay Davenport
197	Maria Sharapova
190	Billie Jean King

#	Appearances
95	**Venus Williams**
82	Serena Williams
72	Alizé Cornet
71	Amy Frazier
71	Svetlana Kuznetsova
70	Francesca Schiavone
69	Sam Stosur
69	**Victoria Azarenka**
67	/ Martina Navratilova
67	**Anastasia Pavlyuchenkova**

=== Grand Slam tournament consecutive streaks ===
This section is for consecutive streaks across all Grand Slam tournaments. If a player skips a tournament the streak ends.

(3) Denotes multiple streaks within one category

active streaks in boldface

#	Titles	Start–end
6	Maureen Connolly	1952 WM–1953 US
6	Margaret Court	1969 US–1971 AU
6	/ Martina Navratilova	1983 WM–1984 US
5	Steffi Graf	1988 AU–1989 AU
4	/ Molla Mallory	1915 US–1918 US
4	Steffi Graf (2)	1993 FR–1994 AU
4	Serena Williams	2002 FR–2003 AU
4	Serena Williams (2)	2014 US–2015 WM
3	Helen Wills	1928 FR–1928 US
3	Helen Wills (2)	1929 FR–1929 US
3	Pauline Betz	1942 US–1944 US
3	Shirley Fry	1956 WM–1957 AU
3	Margaret Court (2)	1965 WM–1966 AU
3	Billie Jean King	1967 WM–1968 AU
3	Billie Jean King (2)	1972 FR–1972 US
3	/ Martina Navratilova (2)	1981 AU–1982 WM
3	Chris Evert	1982 US–1983 FR
3	Steffi Graf (3)	1989 WM–1990 AU
3	/ Monica Seles	1991 US–1992 FR
3	Steffi Graf (4)	1995 FR–1995 US
3	Steffi Graf (5)	1996 FR–1996 US
3	Martina Hingis	1997 WM–1998 AU

#	Finals	Start–end
13	Steffi Graf	1987 FR–1990 FR
11	/ Martina Navratilova	1985 FR–1987 US
6	Maureen Connolly	1952 WM–1953 US
6	Margaret Court	1969 US–1971 AU
6	/ Martina Navratilova (2)	1983 WM–1984 US
6	Chris Evert	1984 FR–1985 WM
6	/ Monica Seles	1991 US–1993 AU
5	Pauline Betz	1941 US–1945 US
5	Margaret Court (2)	1963 WM–1964 WM
5	Margaret Court (3)	1965 AU–1966 AU
5	Steffi Graf (2)	1993 AU–1994 AU
5	Martina Hingis	1997 AU–1998 AU

#	Semifinals	Start–end
19	/ Martina Navratilova	1983 WM–1988 AU
15	Steffi Graf	1987 FR–1990 US
11	Chris Evert	1984 FR–1986 US
11	Martina Hingis	1996 US–1999 FR
10	Serena Williams	2014 US–2017 AU
9	Margaret Court	1969 AU–1971 AU
9	Chris Evert (2)	1981 FR–1983 FR
7	Maria Bueno	1964 FR–1965 US
7	Margaret Court (2)	1965 AU–1966 WM
7	Billie Jean King	1967 WM–1969 AU
7	Chris Evert (3)	1973 FR–1974 US

#	Quarterfinals	Start–end
19	/ Martina Navratilova	1983 WM–1988 AU
19	Steffi Graf	
15	Gabriela Sabatini	1990 WM–1994 AU
11	Margaret Court	1968 WM–1971 AU
11	Billie Jean King	1967 FR–1969 US
11	Chris Evert	
11	Martina Hingis	
10	Lindsay Davenport	
10	Serena Williams	
9	/ Martina Navratilova (2)	
9	Chris Evert (2)	
9	Steffi Graf (2)	
9	Serena Williams (2)	

#	Match wins	Start–end
45	/ Martina Navratilova	1983 WM–1984 AU
40	Steffi Graf	1988 AU–1989 FR
35	Margaret Court	1969 US–1971 FR
33	Maureen Connolly	1952 WM–1953 US
33	Serena Williams	2002 FR–2003 FR
33	Serena Williams (2)	2014 US–2015 US
32	Steffi Graf (2)	1993 FR–1994 FR
27	Steffi Graf (3)	1989 WM–1990 FR
27	/ Monica Seles	1991 US–1992 WM

#	Consecutive appearances
69	Alizé Cornet
62	Ai Sugiyama
61	Francesca Schiavone
56	Jelena Janković
54	Nathalie Dechy
54	Elena Likhovtseva
52	Patty Schnyder
51	Angelique Kerber
49	Caroline Garcia
48	Ana Ivanovic
48	Anastasia Pavlyuchenkova

=== Grand Slam match and final winning percentages ===
%	W–L	Matches
96.90*	125–4*	Helen Wills
96.30	52–2	Maureen Connolly
90.00	207–23	Margaret Court
89.75	280–32	Steffi Graf
88.99	299–37	Chris Evert
86.76	367–56	Serena Williams
86.20	306–49	/ Martina Navratilova
85.38	181–31	/ Monica Seles
84.38	54–10	Althea Gibson
83.43	141–28	Justine Henin
Minimum 50 wins

%	W–L	Finals
100.00	9–0	Maureen Connolly
100.00	8–0	Suzanne Lenglen
100.00	6–0	**Iga Świątek**
100.00	5–0	Daphne Akhurst
100.00	5–0	Alice Marble
86.36	19–3	Helen Wills
82.76	24–5	Margaret Court
72.72	8–3	/ Molla Mallory
71.43	5–2	Althea Gibson
70.97	22–9	Steffi Graf
Minimum 5 titles

* Not all sources agree with one of Wills' losses. She did not play two matches because of appendicitis, causing her to miss the 1926 Wimbledon Championships. Wimbledon did not assign a loss to her or a win to her opponent. The other tournament gave her a loss instead of a default to her and a walkover to her opponent, neither of which count as a loss or a win. It is unknown why the tournament chose to assign a loss to her. Taking these facts into consideration, her adjusted win percentage would be 125–3 = 97.66%.

=== Grand Slam career achievements ===
==== Grand Slam, Golden Slam and Super Slam ====
Career Grand Slam *	Event of completion
Maureen Connolly	1953 French International Championships
Doris Hart	1954 U. S. National Championships
Shirley Fry Irvin	1957 Australian National Championships
Margaret Court	1963 Wimbledon Championships
Billie Jean King	1972 French Open
Chris Evert	1982 Australian Open
/ Martina Navratilova	1983 US Open
Steffi Graf	1988 US Open
Serena Williams	2003 Australian Open
Maria Sharapova	2012 French Open
* each Grand Slam title at least once

Career Golden Slam *	Event of completion
Steffi Graf	1988 Olympics
Serena Williams	2012 Olympics
* Career Slam + Olympic Gold (since 1988)

Career Super Slam *	Event of completion
Steffi Graf	1988 Olympics
Serena Williams	2012 Olympics
* Career Golden Slam + Year-End Championship (since 1970)

==== Winning tournament without losing a set ====
- Minimum 2

#	Player	Majors
13	Helen Wills Moody	1927 US, 1928 FR, 1928 WM, 1928 US, 1929 FR, 1929 WM, 1929 US, 1930 FR, 1930 WM, 1931 US, 1932 FR, 1932 WM, 1938 WM
6	Martina Navratilova	1983 WM, 1983 US, 1984 WM, 1986 WM, 1987 US, 1990 WM
6	Serena Williams	2002 WM, 2002 US, 2008 US, 2010 WM, 2014 US, 2017 AU
5	Suzanne Lenglen	1922 WM, 1923 WM, 1925 FR, 1925 WM, 1926 FR
5	Maureen Connolly	1953 AU, 1953 WM, 1953 US, 1954 FR, 1954 WM
5	Margaret Court	1961 AU, 1962 AU, 1963 AU, 1965 WM, 1966 AU
5	Chris Evert	1974 FR, 1976 US, 1977 US, 1978 US, 1981 WM
5	Steffi Graf	1988 AU, 1988 FR, 1989 AU, 1994 AU, 1996 US
4	Nancye Wynne Bolton	1946 AU, 1947 AU, 1948 AU, 1951 AU
4	Evonne Goolagong Cowley	1971 FR, 1975 AU, 1976 AU, 1977 AU
3	Hilde Krahwinkel Sperling	1935 FR, 1936 AU, 1937 FR
3	Billie Jean King	1971 US, 1972 FR, 1972 US
3	Lindsay Davenport	1998 US, 1999 WM, 2000 AU
3	Justine Henin	2006 FR, 2007 FR, 2007 US
2	Doris Hart	1951 WM, 1952 FR
2	Martina Hingis	1997 AU, 1997 US
2	Venus Williams	2001 US, 2008 WM

==== Youngest and oldest winners ====
Age of first title		Event
15y 9m	Lottie Dod	1887 Wimbledon
16y 3m	Martina Hingis	1997 Australian Open
16y 6m	Monica Seles	1990 French Open
16y 9m	Tracy Austin	1979 US Open
16y 11m	Maureen Connolly	1951 US Champ.

Age of last title		Event
42y 5m	Molla Mallory	1926 US Champ.
38y 0m	Maud Barger-Wallach	1908 US Champ.
37y 8m	Charlotte Cooper	1908 Wimbledon
35y 10m	D. Lambert Chambers	1914 Wimbledon
35y 4m	Serena Williams	2017 Australian Open

==== Players who reached all four major finals during their careers ====
Year	Player
1949	Doris Hart
1953	Maureen Connolly
1957	Shirley Fry Irvin
1957	Althea Gibson
1963	Margaret Court
1965	Maria Bueno
1972	Billie Jean King
1973	Evonne Goolagong Cawley
1975	Chris Evert
1981 WI	/ Hana Mandlíková
1981 US	/ Martina Navratilova
1988	Steffi Graf
1992	/ Monica Seles
1995	Arantxa Sánchez Vicario
1997	Martina Hingis
2003	**Venus Williams**
2003	Serena Williams
2004	Justine Henin
2012	Maria Sharapova

==== Players who reached all four major finals in one calendar year ====
Year	Player
1953	Maureen Connolly
1965	Margaret Court
1970	Margaret Court (2)
1984	Chris Evert
1985	/ Martina Navratilova
1987	/ Martina Navratilova (2)
1988	Steffi Graf
1989	Steffi Graf (2)
1992	/ Monica Seles
1993	Steffi Graf (3)
1997	Martina Hingis
2006	Justine Henin

Refer also to the "Calendar year achievements" section.

==== Season streaks ====
#	3+ titles	Years
2	Helen Wills	1928–1929
2	Margaret Court	1969–1970
2	/ Martina Navratilova	1983–1984
2	Steffi Graf	1988–1989
2	Monica Seles	1991–1992
2	Steffi Graf (2)	1995–1996

#	2+ titles	Years
6	/ Martina Navratlova	1982–1987
4	Helen Wills	1927–1930
3	Maureen Connolly	1952–1954
3	Chris Evert	1974–1976
2	Margaret Court	1988–1996
2	Steffi Graf	1988–1989
2	Monica Seles	1991–1992
2	Steffi Graf (2)	1995–1996
2	**Venus Williams**	2000–2001
2	Serena Williams	2002–2003
2	Serena Williams (2)	2009–2010
2	Serena Williams (3)	2012–2013

#	1+ title	Years
13	Chris Evert	1974–1986
10	Steffi Graf	1987–1996
7	Helen Wills	1927–1933
7	Margaret Court	1960–1966
7	/ Martina Navratlova	1981–1987
6	Serena Williams	2012–2017
5	Suzanne Lenglen	1919–1923
5	Helen Jacobs	1932–1936
5	Margaret Osbourne DuPont	1946–1950
5	Billie Jean King	1971–1975
5	Justine Henin	2003–2007

#	1+ final	Years
14	Chris Evert	1973–1986
13	Serena Williams	2007–2019
11	Billie Jean King	1965–1975
11	/ Martina Navratilova	1981–1990
10	Doris Hart	1946–1955
10	Steffi Graf	1987–1996
8	Charlotte Cooper	1895–1902
7	Esna Boyd	1922–1928
7	Helen Wills	1927–1933
7	Margaret Court	1960–1966
7	Evonne Goolagong Cawley	1971–1977

=== Calendar year achievements ===
Golden Grand Slam *	Event of completion
Steffi Graf	1988 Olympics
* The Grand Slam + Olympic Gold

Four majors

Grand Slam *	Year
Maureen Connolly	1953
Margaret Court	1970
Steffi Graf	1988
* Won all 4 major titles

3 major wins & 1 final	Year
Margaret Court	1965
Steffi Graf	1989
Monica Seles	1992
Steffi Graf (2)	1993
Martina Hingis	1997

2 major wins & 2 finals	Year
/ Martina Navratilova	1985
/ Martina Navratilova (2)	1987

1 major win & 3 finals	Year
Chris Evert	1984
Justine Henin	2006

All 4 semifinals	Year
Doris Hart	1950
Maureen Connolly	1953
Maria Bueno	1965
Margaret Court	1965
Nancy Richey	1966
Billie Jean King	1968
Margaret Court (2)	1969
Margaret Court (3)	1970
Margaret Court (4)	1973
Evonne Goolagong	1973
Chris Evert	1974

All 4 semifinals	Year
Chris Evert (2)	1981
Chris Evert (3)	1982
Chris Evert (4)	1984
/ Martina Navratilova	1984
Chris Evert (5)	1985
/ Martina Navratilova (2)	1985
/ Martina Navratilova (3)	1987
Steffi Graf	1988
Steffi Graf (2)	1989
Steffi Graf (3)	1990
Monica Seles	1992

All 4 semifinals	Year
Steffi Graf (4)	1993
Conchita Martínez	1995
Martina Hingis	1997
Martina Hingis (2)	1998
Jennifer Capriati	2001
Justine Henin	2003
Kim Clijsters	2003
Justine Henin (2)	2006
Serena Williams	2015
Serena Williams (2)	2016
**Aryna Sabalenka**	2023
Aryna Sabalenka (2)	2025

All 4 quarterfinals	Year
Doris Hart	1950
Maureen Connolly	1953
Sandra Reynolds	1959
Maria Bueno	1960
Margaret Court	1961
Margaret Court (2)	1963
Maria Bueno (2)	1965
Margaret Court (3)	1965
Nancy Richey	1966
Lesley Turner	1967
Billie Jean King	1968
Margaret Court (4)	1969
Billie Jean King (2)	1969
Rosie Casals	1969
Margaret Court (5)	1970
Virginia Wade	1972
Margaret Court (6)	1973
Evonne Goolagong	1973
Chris Evert	1974
Martina Navrátilová	1975
Chris Evert (2)	1981
/ Martina Navratilova	1981
Hana Mandlíková	1981

All 4 quarterfinals	Year
Chris Evert (3)	1982
/ Martina Navratilova (2)	1982
Chris Evert (4)	1984
/ Martina Navratilova (3)	1984
Chris Evert (5)	1985
/ Martina Navratilova (4)	1985
/ Martina Navratilova (5)	1987
Claudia Kohde-Kilsch	1987
Steffi Graf	1988
Steffi Graf (2)	1989
Steffi Graf (3)	1990
Gabriela Sabatini	1991
Arantxa Sánchez Vicario	1991
Steffi Graf (4)	1991
Gabriela Sabatini (2)	1992
Monica Seles	1992
Steffi Graf (5)	1993
Gabriela Sabatini (3)	1993
Conchita Martínez	1995
Martina Hingis	1997
Arantxa Sánchez Vicario (2)	1998
Lindsay Davenport	1998
**Venus Williams**	1998
Martina Hingis (2)	1998

All 4 quarterfinals	Year
Lindsay Davenport (2)	1999
Martina Hingis (3)	2000
Jennifer Capriati	2001
Serena Williams	2001
Monica Seles (2)	2002
Jennifer Capriati (2)	2002
**Venus Williams (2)**	2002
Justine Henin	2003
Kim Clijsters	2003
Amélie Mauresmo	2004
Lindsay Davenport (3)	2005
Maria Sharapova	2005
Justine Henin (2)	2006
Serena Williams (2)	2007
Serena Williams (3)	2009
Serena Williams (4)	2015
Serena Williams (5)	2016
**Aryna Sabalenka**	2023
**Aryna Sabalenka (2)**	2025
**Iga Swiatek**	2025

Three majors

3 Slam wins	Year
Helen Wills	1928
Helen Wills (2)	1929
Margaret Court	1962
Margaret Court (2)	1965
Margaret Court (3)	1969
Billie Jean King	1972
Margaret Court (4)	1973
/ Martina Navratilova	1983
Martina Navaratilova (2)	1984
Steffi Graf	1989
Monica Seles	1991
Monica Seles (2)	1992
Steffi Graf (2)	1993
Steffi Graf (3)	1995
Steffi Graf (4)	1996
Martina Hingis	1997
Serena Williams	2002
Serena Williams (2)	2015

2 Slam wins & 1 final	Year
Pauline Betz Addie	1946
Margaret Osborne duPont	1949
Althea Gibson	1957
Margaret Court	1963
Maria Bueno	1964
Margaret Court (2)	1964
Billie Jean King	1968
Evonne Goolagong	1971
Chris Evert	1974
Chris Evert (2)	1980
Chris Evert (3)	1982
/ Martina Navratilova	1982
/ Martina Navratilova (2)	1986
Arantxa Sánchez Vicario	1994
**Angelique Kerber**	2016

1 Slam win & 2 finals	Year
Helen Jacobs	1934
Doris Hart	1950
Shirley Fry Irvin	1951
Evonne Goolagong	1975
Evonne Goolagong (2)	1976
Chris Evert (2)	1979
Chris Evert (3)	1985
Steffi Graf	1987
Steffi Graf (2)	1990
Martina Hingis	1999
Lindsay Davenport	2000
Serena Williams	2016
Aryna Sabalenka	2025

3 Slam finals (all losses)	Year
Doris Hart	1953
Nancy Richey	1966
Evonne Goolagong	1972
Arantxa Sánchez Vicario	1995
**Venus Williams**	2002

==== Consecutive majors ====
Four

Australian/French/Wimbledon/United States	Year
Maureen Connolly	1953
Margaret Court	1970
Steffi Graf	1988

Three

Australian/French/Wimbledon	Year
Serena Williams	2015

French/Wimbledon/United States	Year
Helen Wills	1928
Helen Wills (2)	1929
Billie Jean King	1972
/ Martina Navratilova	1984
Steffi Graf	1993
Steffi Graf (2)	1995
Steffi Graf (3)	1996
Serena Williams	2002

Wimbledon/United States/Australian	Year
/ Martina Navratilova	1983

Two

Australian/French	Year
Margaret Court	1962
Margaret Court (2)	1964
Margaret Court (3)	1969
Monica Seles	1991
Monica Seles (2)	1992
Jennifer Capriati	2001

French/Wimbledon	Year
Suzanne Lenglen	1925
Helen Wills	1930
Cilly Aussem	1931
Helen Wills (2)	1932
Maureen Connolly	1954
Evonne Goolagong Cawley	1971
Billie Jean King	1972
Chris Evert	1974
/ Martina Navratilova	1982

Wimbledon/United States	Year
Helen Wills	1927
Alice Marble	1939
Pauline Betz	1946
Maureen Connolly	1952
Shirley Fry Irvin	1956
Althea Gibson	1957
Althea Gibson (2)	1958
Maria Bueno	1959
Maria Bueno (2)	1964
Margaret Court	1965
Billie Jean King	1967
Billie Jean King (2)	1972
Chris Evert	1976
/ Martina Navratilova	1986
/ Martina Navratilova (2)	1987
Steffi Graf	1989
Martina Hingis	1997
Venus Williams	2000
Venus Williams (2)	2001
Serena Williams	2012

United States/Australian	Year
Chris Evert	1982
Aryna Sabalenka	2024

==== Single season winning percentage ====
%*	W–L	Match winning	Year
100	27–0	Steffi Graf	1988
100	26–0	Margaret Court	1970
100	22–0	Maureen Connolly	1953
100	21–0	Monica Seles	1991
100	21–0	Steffi Graf (2)	1995
100	21–0	Steffi Graf (3)	1996
100	21–0	Serena Williams	2002
96.43	27–1	Steffi Graf (4)	1989
96.43	27–1	Monica Seles (2)	1992
96.43	27–1	Steffi Graf (5)	1993
96.43	27–1	Martina Hingis	1997
* minimum 20 wins

=== Individual major tournaments ===
==== Titles per tournament ====
- Minimum 3 titles

#	Australian Open
11	Margaret Court
7	Serena Williams
6	Nancye Wynne Bolton
5	Daphne Akhurst
4	Evonne Goolagong Cawley
4	Steffi Graf
4	/ Monica Seles
3	Joan Hartigan
3	/ Martina Navratilova
3	Martina Hingis

#	French Open
7	Chris Evert
6	Steffi Graf
5	Margaret Court
4	Helen Wills
4	Justine Henin
4	**Iga Świątek**
3	Hilde Krahwinkel Sperling
3	/ Monica Seles
3	Arantxa Sánchez Vicario
3	Serena Williams

#	Wimbledon
9	/ Martina Navratilova
8	Helen Wills
7	Dorothea Lambert Chambers
7	Steffi Graf
7	Serena Williams
6	Blanche Bingley Hillyard
6	Suzanne Lenglen
6	Billie Jean King
5	Lottie Dod
5	Charlotte Cooper
5	**Venus Williams**

#	US Open
8	Molla Mallory
7	Helen Wills
6	Chris Evert
6	Serena Williams
5	Margaret Court
5	Steffi Graf
4	Elisabeth Moore
4	Helen Hotchkiss Wightman
4	Helen Jacobs
4	Alice Marble
4	Pauline Betz
4	Maria Bueno
4	Billie Jean King
4	/ Martina Navratilova

==== Consecutive titles per tournament ====
- The French Open was only a Grand Slam tournament from 1925 onwards
- (3) Denotes multiple times

#	Australian Open
7	Margaret Court
4	Nancye Wynne Bolton
3	Daphne Akhurst
3	Margaret Court (2)
3	Evonne Goolagong Cawley
3	Steffi Graf
3	/ Monica Seles
3	Martina Hingis
2	Margaret Molesworth
2	Coral McInnes Buttsworth
2	Joan Hartigan
2	Jennifer Capriati
2	Serena Williams
2	**Victoria Azarenka**
2	**Aryna Sabalenka**

#	French Open
3	Helen Wills
3	Hilde Krahwinkel Sperling
3	/ Monica Seles
3	Justine Henin
3	**Iga Świątek**
2	Suzanne Lenglen
2	Margaret Scriven
2	Simonne Mathieu
2	Maureen Connolly
2	Margaret Court
2	Chris Evert
2	Steffi Graf

#	Wimbledon
6	/ Martina Navratilova
5	Suzanne Lenglen
4	Helen Wills
3	Lottie Dod
3	Louise Brough
3	Maureen Connolly
3	Billie Jean King
3	Steffi Graf
2	Maud Watson
2	Lottie Dodd (2)
2	Charlotte Cooper
2	Blanche Bingley Hillyard
2	Dorothea Lambert Chambers
2	Dorothea Lambert Chambers (2)
2	Dorothea Lambert Chambers (3)
2	Helen Wills (2)
2	Althea Gibson
2	Maria Bueno
2	Billie Jean King (2)
2	/ Martina Navratilova (2)
2	Steffi Graf (2)
2	Steffi Graf (3)
2	**Venus Williams**
2	Serena Williams
2	**Venus Williams** (2)
2	Serena Williams (2)
2	Serena Williams (3)

#	US Open
4	/ Molla Mallory
4	Helen Jacobs
4	Chris Evert
3	Hazel Hotchkiss Wightman
3	Mary Browne
3	/ Molla Mallory (2)
3	Helen Wills (2)
3	Alice Marble
3	Pauline Betz
3	Margaret Osborne duPont
3	Maureen Connolly
3	Serena Williams

Bold: Active players

==== Finals per tournament ====
#	Australian Open
12	Margaret Court
8	Nancye Wynne Bolton
8	Serena Williams
7	Esna Boyd
7	Evonne Goolagong Cawley
6	Thelma Coyne Long
6	/ Martina Navratilova
6	Chris Evert
6	Martina Hingis
5	Daphne Akhurst
5	Steffi Graf

#	French Open
9	Chris Evert
9	Steffi Graf
8	Simonne Mathieu
6	Margaret Court
6	/ Martina Navratilova
6	Aranxta Sánchez-Vicario
5	Doris Hart
5	Ann Haydon Jones
4	Helen Wills
4	Lesley Turner Bowrey
4	/ Monica Seles
4	Justine Henin
4	Serena Williams
4	**Iga Świątek**

#	Wimbledon
13	Blanche Bingley Hillyard
12	/ Martina Navratilova
11	Charlotte Cooper
11	Dorothea Douglass Lambert Chambers
11	Serena Williams
10	Chris Evert
9	Helen Wills
9	Billie Jean King
9	Steffi Graf
9	**Venus Williams**

#	US Open
10	Molla Mallory
10	Serena Williams
9	Helen Wills
9	Chris Evert
8	Elisabeth Moore
8	Helen Jacobs
8	/ Martina Navratilova
8	Steffi Graf
7	Doris Hart
6	Pauline Betz
6	Louise Brough
6	Margaret Court
6	Billie Jean King

Bold: Active players

==== Match wins per tournament ====
#	Australian Open
92	Serena Williams
60	Margaret Court
57	Maria Sharapova
56	Lindsay Davenport
54	**Venus Williams**
52	Martina Hingis
50	**Victoria Azarenka**
47	Steffi Graf
46	Thelma Coyne Long
46	/ Martina Navratilova

#	French Open
84	Steffi Graf
72	Chris Evert
72	Arantxa Sánchez Vicario
69	Serena Williams
62	Conchita Martínez
56	Maria Sharapova
54	/ Monica Seles
52	Svetlana Kuznetsova
51	/ Martina Navratilova
48	**Venus Williams**

#	Wimbledon
120	/ Martina Navratilova
98	Serena Williams
96	Chris Evert
95	Billie Jean King
90	**Venus Williams**
74	Steffi Graf
64	Virginia Wade
57	Ann Haydon Jones
56	Louise Brough
55	Helen Wills
55	Helen Jacobs

#	US Open
108	Serena Williams
101	Chris Evert
89	/ Martina Navratilova
79	**Venus Williams**
73	Steffi Graf
65	/ Molla Mallory
63	Helen Jacobs
62	Lindsay Davenport
60	Louise Brough
58	Billie Jean King

==== Match win streaks per tournament ====
A streak does not end if a player skips one or more tournaments between two wins.

#	Australian Open	Years
38	Margaret Court	1960–68
33	/ Monica Seles	1991–99
27	Martina Hingis	1997–2000
25	Steffi Graf	1988–91
21	Margaret Court	1969–75
20	Evonne Goolagong Cawley	1974–77
20	Aryna Sabalenka	2023–25
18	Victoria Azarenka	2012–14
17	Nancye Wynne Bolton	1947–49
14	Jennifer Capriati	2001–02
14	Serena Williams	2009–10

#	French Open	Years
29	Chris Evert	1974–81
26	Iga Świątek	2022–25
25	/ Monica Seles	1990–96
24	Justine Henin	2006–10
20	Steffi Graf	1987–89
19	Helen Wills	1928–32
19	Chris Evert	1985–87
15	Hilde Krahwinkel Sperling	1935–37
14	Margaret Scriven	1933–35
14	Margaret Smith Court	1969–71

#	Wimbledon	Years
50	Helen Wills	1927–38
47	/ Martina Navratilova	1982–88
23	Billie Jean King	1966–69
22	Louise Brough	1948–51
21	Steffi Graf	1991–93
20	Venus Williams	2000–02
20	Serena Williams	2002–04
20	Venus Williams	2007–09
18	Maureen Connolly	1952–54
18	Maria Bueno	1959–62
17	Serena Williams	2009–11

#	US Open	Years
46	Helen Wills	1923–33
31	Chris Evert	1975–79
28	Helen Jacobs	1932–36
26	Serena Williams	2012–15
20	Margaret Osborne duPont	1948–53
20	Monica Seles	1991–95
20	Venus Williams	2000–02
19	Pauline Betz	1942–45
18	Alice Marble	1938–40
17	Maureen Connolly	1951–53
17	Darlene Hard	1960–62
17	Maria Bueno	1963–65
17	Margaret Smith Court	1969–72

==== Winning percentage per tournament ====
% *	W–L	Australian Open
95.83	23–1	Daphne Akhurst
95.23	60–3	Margaret Court
91.49	43–4	/ Monica Seles
88.67	47–6	Steffi Graf
88.23	30–4	Chris Evert
88.13	52–7	Martina Hingis
87.62	92–13	Serena Williams
86.35	45–7	/ Martina Navratilova
86.27	44–7	Nancye Wynne Bolton
82.93	34–7	**Aryna Sabalenka**
* Minimum 20 wins

% *	W–L	French Open
95.23	20–1	Helen Wills
93.02	40–3	**Iga Świątek**
92.31	72–6	Chris Evert
89.80	44–5	Margaret Court
89.36	84–10	Steffi Graf
88.37	38–5	Justine Henin
87.10	54–8	/ Monica Seles
84.85	28–5	Doris Hart
84.70	72–13	Arantxa Sánchez Vicario
84.62	44–8	Ann Haydon Jones
84.62	22–4	Shirley Fry
* Minimum 20 wins

% *	W–L	Wimbledon
98.21	55–1	Helen Wills
94.59	35–2	Suzanne Lenglen **
91.35	74–7	Steffi Graf
89.55	120–14	/ Martina Navratilova
88.89	56–7	Louise Brough
87.50	98–14	Serena Williams
86.49	96–15	Chris Evert
86.36	95–15	Billie Jean King
85.00	51–9	Margaret Court
84.75	50–9	Maria Bueno
* Minimum 20 wins

% *	W–L	US Open
96.15	50–2	Helen Wills
90.27	65–7	/ Molla Mallory
89.66	52–6	Margaret Court
89.38	101–12	Chris Evert
89.19	33–4	Pauline Betz
89.02	73–9	Steffi Graf
88.57	31–4	Alice Marble
88.57	31–4	Tracy Austin
87.80	108–15	Serena Williams
87.04	47–7	Maria Bueno
* Minimum 20 wins

- ** both losses were actually "default", Suzanne Lenglen's adjusted win percentage would be 100%.

=== Titles by decade ===
minimum 2 titles

1880s

2	Lottie Dod, Blanche Bingley Hillyard, Bertha Townsend, Maud Watson

1890s

3	Juliette Atkinson, Lottie Dod, Blanche Bingley Hillyard, Charlotte Cooper Sterry

2	Mabel Cahill

1900s

3	Dorothea Lambert Chambers, Elisabeth Moore, May Sutton

2	Charlotte Cooper Sterry

1910s

4	Dorothea Lambert Chambers, Molla Bjurstedt Mallory

3	Mary Browne, Hazel Hotchkiss Wightman

1920s

11	Helen Wills Moody

7	Suzanne Lenglen

4	Daphne Akhurst, Molla Bjurstedt Mallory

2	Kathleen McKane Godfree, Margaret Molesworth

1930s

8	Helen Wills Moody

5	Helen Jacobs

4	Alice Marble

3	Joan Hartigan, Dorothy Round, Hilde Krahwinkel Sperling

2	Cilly Aussem, Coral McInnes Buttsworth, Simonne Mathieu, Margaret Scriven

1940s

5	Pauline Betz, Margaret Osborne

4	Nancye Wynne Bolton

3	Louise Brough

2	Sarah Palfrey Cooke

1950s

9	Maureen Connolly

5	Althea Gibson, Doris Hart

4	Shirley Fry

3	Louise Brough

2	Angela Mortimer, Maria Bueno, Thelma Coyne Long, Mary Carter Reitano

1960s

16	Margaret Court

5	Maria Bueno, Billie Jean King

3	Darlene Hard, Ann Haydon-Jones

2	Lesley Turner Bowrey, Nancy Richey

1970s

9	Chris Evert

8	Margaret Court

7	Billie Jean King

6	Evonne Goolagong

2	Martina Navratilova, Virginia Wade

1980s

15	Martina Navratilova

9	Chris Evert

8	Steffi Graf

4	Hana Mandlíková

1990s

14	Steffi Graf

9	Monica Seles

5	Martina Hingis

3	Arantxa Sánchez Vicario

2	Lindsay Davenport

2000s

10	Serena Williams

7	Justine Henin, Venus Williams

3	Jennifer Capriati, Maria Sharapova

2	Amélie Mauresmo, Svetlana Kuznetsova, Kim Clijsters

2010s

12	Serena Williams

3	Angelique Kerber

2	Kim Clijsters, **Victoria Azarenka**, Li Na, Maria Sharapova, **Petra Kvitová**, Garbiñe Muguruza, **Naomi Osaka**, Simona Halep

2020s

6	**Iga Świątek**

4	**Aryna Sabalenka**

2	**Naomi Osaka**, Ashleigh Barty, **Barbora Krejčíková**, **Coco Gauff**

== All tournament records ==
=== Tournament records and streaks ===
==== Career titles and finals ====
#	Titles
244	Elizabeth Ryan
192	Margaret Court
167	/ Martina Navratilova
157	Chris Evert
147	Simonne Mathieu
136	Ann Haydon Jones
129	Billie Jean King
108	Angela Mortimer
107	Steffi Graf
106	Ilse Friedleben

#	Finals
299	Elizabeth Ryan
239	/ Martina Navratilova
233	Margaret Court
228	Ann Haydon Jones
226	Chris Evert
190	Simonne Mathieu
189	Billie Jean King
150	Evonne Goolagong
149	Ilse Friedleben
138	Steffi Graf

==== Tournament streaks ====
#	Consecutive titles	Years
27	Helen Wills	1927–33
21	Suzanne Lenglen	1922–24
13	Martina Navratilova	1984
10	Steffi Graf	1989–90
9	Chris Evert	1974

#	Consecutive finals	Years
29	Helen Wills	1926–35
23	/ Martina Navratilova	1983–84
22	Steffi Graf	1989–90
21	Suzanne Lenglen	1922–24
21	Steffi Graf	1986–88
11	Chris Evert	1974

#	1+ title per year	Years
21	/ Martina Navratilova	1974–94
18	Chris Evert	1971–88
16	Billie Jean King	1960–75
15	Molla Mallory	1914–28
14	Steffi Graf	1986–99
13	Evonne Goolagong	1968–80
13	Maria Sharapova	2003–15
12	Maria Bueno	1957–68
11	Virginia Wade	1968–78
11	Serena Williams	2007–17
11	Caroline Wozniacki	2008–18

==== Most titles at a single tournament ====
Notes: Minimum titles 7

#	Titles	Tournament	Years
13	Kathleen Nunneley	New Zealand Championships	1895–1907
13	Christiane Mercelis	Belgian Closed Covered Court Championships	1956–1968
12	/ Hilde Krahwinkel Sperling	Danish Indoor Championships	1932–42, 1944
12	Christiane Mercelis	Belgian Closed Outdoor Championships	1951, 1953–61, 1963–64, 1966
12	/ Martina Navratilova	Chicago	1978–83, 1986–88, 1990–92
11	Blanche Bingley Hillyard	South of England Championships	1885, 1888, 1891–93, 1895–96, 1898–1900, 1905
11	Ora Washington	Black New York State Championships	1925–26, 1928–33, 1935–37
11	Desideria Ampon	Philippines International Championships	1955–56, 1958–60, 1965–69, 1971
11	Margaret Court	**Australian National Championships/Open**	1960–66, 1969–71, 1973
11	/ Martina Navratilova	Eastbourne	1978, 1982–86, 1988–91, 1993
10	Muriel Goward-Cole	British Columbia Championships	1896–99, 1901–05
10	Lois Moyes Bickle	Canadian Championships	1906–1908, 1910, 1913, 1914, 1920–1922, 1924
10	Louise Gatehouse Bond	Tasmanian Championships	1927–34, 1936, 1939
10	Leela Row Dayal	Bombay Presidency Hard Court Championships	1930, 1933–40, 1950
10	Věra Suková	Czechoslovak Closed Championships	1952, 1954–63
9	Louisa Martin	Irish Lawn Tennis Championships	1889–92, 1896, 1899–1900, 1902–03
9	Clara von der Schulenburg	Championships of Berlin	1896–98, 1903–1905, 1909–10, 1920
9	Carrie Neely	Illinois State Championships	1907–08, 1911–13, 1915–16, 1919
9	Tokuko Moriwake	Hawaiian Championships	1925–33
9	Betty Lombard	Irish Hard Court Championships	1940, 1943, 1945, 1947–49, 1952–53, 1955
9	Althea Gibson	American Tennis Association Championships	1947–56
9	/ Martina Navratilova	Washington	1975, 1977–78, 1982–83, 1985–86, 1988, 1990
9	/ Martina Navratilova	**Wimbledon Championships**	1978–79, 1982–87, 1990
9	Martina Navratilova	Dallas	1979–83, 1985–87, 1990
9	Steffi Graf	German Open	1986–89, 1991–94, 1996
8	Agnes Nicklson	Auckland Championships	1895–1903
8	Kate Williams	Intermountain Championships	1905–11, 1913
8	Elizabeth Ryan	Beaulieu Championships	1913, 1921–22, 1924–28, 1932
8	Elizabeth Ryan	Cannes Métropole Club Championship	1913–14, 1923, 1924–25, 1928, 1930
8	Molla Mallory	U.S. National Championships	1915–18, 1920, 1921–22, 1926
8	Elizabeth Ryan	Kent Championships	1919–21, 1923–25, 1928
8	Elizabeth Ryan	Carlton Club de Cannes Championship	1920, 1921–22, 1924–25, 1928, 1930–32
8	Majorie Macfarlane	Auckland Championships	1921, 1924–1926, 1928–29, 1932–33
8	Helen Wills	**Wimbledon Championships**	1927–30, 1932–33, 1935, 1938
8	Chris Evert	Hilton Head	1974–78, 1981, 1984–85
8	/ Martina Navratilova	WTA Tour Finals	1978–79, 1981, 1983–86^{Mar, Nov in 1986}
8	/ Martina Navratilova	Los Angeles	1978, 1980–81, 1983, 1986, 1989, 1992–93
8	Serena Williams	Miami Masters	2002–04, 2007–08, 2013–15
7	Blanche Bingley Hillyard	Derbyshire Championships	1885, 1888, 1893–94, 1896, 1901, 1906
7	Maude Garfit	Conishead Priory Open	1901–07
7	Dorothea Douglass	Kent Championships	1901–02, 1904–06, 1910–11, 1913
7	Dorothea Douglass	**Wimbledon Championships**	1903–04, 1906, 1910–11, 1913–14
7	Agnes Morton	Essex Championships	1904–09, 1911
7	Dorothea Douglass	British Covered Court Championships	1904, 1906, 1908, 1910–11, 1913, 1919
7	Germaine Golding	French Covered Court Championships	1911, 1920–21, 1923–24, 1926, 1931
7	Molla Mallory	Ardsley Invitation	1917–18, 1920, 1921–27
7	Phoebe Holcroft Watson	Bexhill-on-Sea Open	1922–28
7	May Spiers	Canterbury Championships	1922–28
7	Helen Wills	**U.S. National Championships**	1923–25, 1927–29, 1931
7	Ora Washington	American Tennis Association Championships	1929–35, 1937
7	/ Hilde Sperling	German Covered Court Championships	1930–32, 1935–37
7	Doreen Sansoni	Ceylon Championships	1935-1940, 1946
7	Margaret Court	Victorian Championships	1961–65, 1969–70
7	Bonnie Logan	American Tennis Association Championships	1964–70
7	Virginia Wade	Dewar Cup Finals	1968–69, 1971, 1973–76
7	/ Martina Navratilova	Orlando	1974, 1980–85
7	Chris Evert	**French Open**	1974–75, 1979–80, 1983, 1985–86
7	Steffi Graf	**Wimbledon Championships**	1988–89, 1991–93, 1995–96
7	Serena Williams	**Wimbledon Championships**	2002–03, 2009–10, 2012, 2015–16
7	Serena Williams	**Australian Open**	2003, 2005, 2007, 2009–10, 2015, 2017

==== Most finals at a single tournament ====
#	Finals	Tournament	Years
14	Carrie Neely	Western States Championships	1895–96, 1905, 1907–11, 1913, 1915–18
14	Desideria Ampon	Philippines International Championships	1955–57, 1958–62, 1965–69, 1971
14	/ Martina Navratilova	WTA Tour Finals	1975, 1978–86^{Mar, Nov in 86}, 1989, 1991–92
14	/ Martina Navratilova	Chicago	1975, 1978–83, 1986–88, 1990–93
13	Blanche Bingley	Wimbledon	1885–89, 1891–94, 1897, 1899–1901
13	Joyce Barclay	Scottish Championships	1960, 1962–66, 1968, 1970–73, 1975, 1979
13	/ Martina Navratilova	Eastbourne	1978–79, 1982–87, 1988–91, 1993
12	Margaret Court	Australian National Championships/Open	1960–66, 1969–71, 1973
12	/ Martina Navratilova	Wimbledon	1978–79, 1982–90, 1994
11	Charlotte Cooper	Wimbledon	1895–1902, 1904, 1908, 1912
11	Dorothea Douglass	Wimbledon	1903–07, 1910–11, 1913–14, 1919–20
11	Germaine Golding	French Covered Court Championships	1911, 1914, 1920–21, 1923–24, 1926–29, 1931
11	/ Martina Navratilova	Washington	1975, 1977–80, 1982–83, 1985–86, 1988, 1990
11	/ Martina Navratilova	Dallas	1975–76, 1979–83, 1985–87, 1990
11	/ Martina Navratilova	Los Angeles	1977–81, 1983, 1986, 1989–90, 1992–93
11	Steffi Graf	German Open	1985–89, 1990–94, 1996
11	Serena Williams	Wimbledon	2002–04, 2008–10, 2012, 2015–16, 2018–19
10	Molla Mallory	U.S. National Championships	1915–18, 1920, 1921–22, 1923–24 1926
10	Chris Evert	Wimbledon	1973–74, 1976, 1978–82, 1984–85
10	Serena Williams	Miami Masters	1999, 2002–04, 2007–09, 2013–15
9	Helen Wills	U.S. National Championships	1922–25, 1927–29, 1931, 1933
9	Helen Wills	Wimbledon	1924, 1927–30, 1932–33, 1935, 1938
9	Ann Haydon Jones	Welsh Championships	1955, 1957–59, 1964, 1967
9	Billie Jean King	Wimbledon	1963, 1966–70, 1972–73, 1975
9	Chris Evert	US Open	1975–80, 1982–84
9	Chris Evert	French Open	1973–75, 1979–80, 1983–86
9	Chris Evert	Family Circle	1974–78, 1981, 1984–86
9	/ Martina Navratilova	Houston	1976–80, 1983, 1985, 1987–88
9	/ Martina Navratilova	Stuttgart	1979, 1981–83, 1986–88, 1991–92
9	/ Martina Navratilova	West Classic	1979–80, 1984, 1988, 1990–94
9	Steffi Graf	Florida	1986–89, 1991–95
9	Steffi Graf	Wimbledon	1987–89, 1991–93, 1995–96, 1999
9	Steffi Graf	French Open	1987–90, 1992–93, 1995–96, 1999
9	Venus Williams	Wimbledon	2000–03, 2005, 2007–09, 2017
9	Serena Williams	US Open	1999, 2001–02, 2008, 2011–14, 2018–19

==== Titles by court surface type ====
- Note - Incomplete. Many pre-Open Era titles missing.

#	Hard
47	Serena Williams
38	Steffi Graf
35	Chris Evert
33	Lindsay Davenport
31	Kim Clijsters
31	Venus Williams
29	Billie Jean King
29	/ Martina Navratilova
29	Monica Seles
23	Jadwiga Jędrzejowska

#	Clay
146	Elizabeth Ryan
95	Simonne Mathieu
70	Chris Evert
65	Lolette Payot
51	Ann Haydon Jones
45	Cilly Aussem
45	Angela Mortimer
42	Alice Weiwers
37	Jadwiga Jędrzejowska
32	Steffi Graf

#	Grass
92	Elizabeth Ryan
46	Margaret Court
44	Ann Haydon Jones
38	Evonne Goolagong
35	Angela Mortimer
35	Billie Jean King
32	/ Martina Navratilova
29	Helen Wills-Moody
26	Althea Gibson
23	Jadwiga Jędrzejowska

#	Carpet*
88	/ Martina Navratilova
39	Billie Jean King
35	Chris Evert
31	Steffi Graf
26	Virginia Wade
19	Margaret Court
16	Martina Hingis
15	Evonne Goolagong
14	Tracy Austin
12	Lindsay Davenport
* not used since 2009

Note:This table is incomplete

#	Wood
29	Angela Mortimer
24	Ann Haydon Jones
14	/ Molla Mallory
9	Lolette Payot
* not used since 1967

=== Match records and streaks ===
==== Consecutive match streaks ====
#	Matches won	Years
182	Suzanne Lenglen	1921–26
180	Helen Wills	1927–33
116	Suzanne Lenglen	1914–21
111	Alice Marble	1938–40
74	Martina Navratilova	1984
66	Steffi Graf	1989–90
58	Martina Navratilova	1986–87
57	Althea Gibson	1957–58
57	Margaret Court	1972–73
56	Chris Evert	1974

==== Career match wins ====
#	Player
1442	/ Martina Navratilova
1309	Chris Evert
1180	Margaret Court
1124	Billie Jean King
1077	Ann Haydon Jones
1064	Elizabeth Ryan
902	Steffi Graf
858	Serena Williams
839	Virginia Wade
819	Venus Williams
* minimum 800 wins

==== Career winning percentage ====
W–L	% *	All surfaces
341–7	97.99	Suzanne Lenglen
1064–94	91.90	Elizabeth Ryan
416–37	91.80	Helen Wills
1180–107	91.68	Margaret Court
1309–146	89.96	Chris Evert
331–41	89.00	/ Hilde Krahwinkel Sperling
902–115	88.69	Steffi Graf
668–87	88.50	/ Molla Mallory
607–90	87.10	Angela Mortimer
1442–219	86.81	/ Martina Navratilova
* minimum 300 wins

==== Match wins by court type ====
#	Hardcourt
541	Serena Williams
499	Venus Williams
468	Lindsay Davenport
430	Caroline Wozniacki
400	Jelena Janković
385	Agnieszka Radwańska
384	Svetlana Kuznetsova
392	Maria Sharapova
368	Victoria Azarenka
358	Petra Kvitová

#	Clay
571	Elizabeth Ryan
571	Doris Hart
413	Chris Evert
373	Simonne Mathieu
355	Ann Haydon Jones
342	Arantxa Sánchez
327	Margaret Court
294	Conchita Martínez
287	Steffi Graf
268	Suzanne Lenglen

#	Grass
603	Margaret Court
418	Billie Jean King
415	Elizabeth Ryan
375	/ Molla Mallory
371	Louise Brough
336	Ann Haydon Jones
325	Virginia Wade
317	Margaret Osborne duPont
315	Doris Hart
309	/ Martina Navratilova

#	Carpet *
600	/ Martina Navratilova
314	Chris Evert
251	Virginia Wade
221	Pam Shriver
235	Rosemary Casals
209	Wendy Turnbull
190	Billie Jean King
190	Steffi Graf
182	Helena Suková
175	Zina Garrison
* not used since 2009

#	Outdoor
1036	Margaret Smith Court
1004	Chris Evert
988	Elizabeth Ryan
918	/ Martina Navratilova
849	Billie Jean King
828	Ann Haydon Jones
798	Virginia Wade
782	Serena Williams
707	Venus Williams
693	Steffi Graf

#	Indoor
624	/ Martina Navratilova
359	Virginia Wade
329	Chris Evert
258	Billie Jean King
235	Rosemary Casals
229	Pam Shriver
217	Wendy Turnbull
201	Steffi Graf
195	Zina Garrison
193	Ann Haydon Jones

==== Match winning percentage by court type ====
- active players are denoted in boldface

W–L	%	Clay
268–3	98.90	Suzanne Lenglen
413–24	94.51	Chris Evert
146–13	91.80	Pauline Betz
327–33	90.80	Margaret Smith Court
287–30	90.54	Steffi Graf
571–60	90.50	Elizabeth Ryan
204–24	89.50	/ Hilde Krahwinkel Sperling
231–32	87.80	Angela Mortimer
373–56	86.90	Simonne Mathieu
571–60	86.50	Doris Hart
* Minimum 100 wins

W–L	%	Hard
106–10	91.40	Alice Marble
340–36	90.43	Steffi Graf
294–33	89.91	Chris Evert
291–43	87.13	/ Martina Navratilova
106–18	85.50	Margaret Smith Court
541–95	85.06	Serena Williams
145–28	83.80	Margaret Osborne duPont
312–60	83.87	/ Monica Seles
186–41	81.90	Louise Brough
315–72	81.40	Kim Clijsters
* Minimum 100 wins

W–L	%	Grass
415–26	94.10	Elizabeth Ryan
603–49	92.50	Margaret Smith Court
237–21	91.90	Helen Wills-Moody
294–33	89.91	Chris Evert
182–21	89.70	Alice Marble
315–43	87.99	/ Martina Navratilova
140–22	86.42	Jadwiga Jędrzejowska
178–28	86.41	Althea Gibson
375–59	86.41	/ Molla Mallory
85–15	85.00	Steffi Graf
* Minimum 80 wins

W–L	%	Carpet
120–14	89.60	Margaret Court
189–23	89.15	Steffi Graf
600–74	89.02	/ Martina Navratilova
314–54	85.33	Chris Evert
193–41	82.50	Ann Haydon Jones
249–59	80.84	Billie Jean King
95–23	80.51	Martina Hingis
149–37	80.11	Tracy Austin
97–25	79.51	/ Monica Seles
96–25	79.34	Lindsay Davenport
* Minimum 90 wins

W–L	%	Wood
72–3	96.0	/ Molla Mallory
58–3	95.08	/ Hilde Krahwinkel Sperling
131–9	93.60	Angela Mortimer
193–41	82.50	Ann Haydon Jones
32-10	76.20	Dorothy Holman
57–18	76.00	Germaine Golding
* Minimum 30 wins

=== Calendar year achievements ===
==== Best single season ====
Titles	Titles*	Year
28	Elizabeth Ryan	1924
26	Simonne Mathieu	1935
24	Simonne Mathieu (2)	1936
24	Althea Gibson	1956
22	Elizabeth Ryan (2)	1921
21	Elizabeth Ryan (3)	1922
21	Margaret Court	1970
20	Elizabeth Ryan (4)	1925
20	Margaret Court (2)	1966
19	Elizabeth Ryan (5)	1923
19	Margaret Court (3)	1964

#	Match wins	Year
130	Althea Gibson	1956
129	Elizabeth Ryan	1924
117	Margaret Court	1965
113	Billie Jean King	1971
111	Evonne Goolagong	1973
109	Ann Haydon Jones	1960
109	Margaret Court (2)	1970
108	Margaret Court (3)	1968
106	Elizabeth Ryan (2)	1921
103	Margaret Court (4)	1969
101	Margaret Court (5)	1973

#	Match wins (consecutive)	Year
74	/ Martina Navratilova	1984
55	Chris Evert	1974
51	Margaret Court	1965
46	Steffi Graf	1988
45	Alice Marble	1939
45	Alice Marble (2)	1940

%*	W–L	Match winning*	Year
100.00	66–0	Suzanne Lenglen	1923
100.00	47–0	Suzanne Lenglen (2)	1920
100.00	45–0	Alice Marble	1939
100.00	45–0	Alice Marble (2)	1940
98.80	86–1	/ Martina Navratilova	1983
97.80	44–1	Helen Wills	1925
97.72	86–2	Steffi Graf	1989
97.50	78–2	/ Martina Navratilova (2)	1984
97.40	75–2	Steffi Graf (2)	1987
97.10	66–2	Althea Gibson	1957
* minimum 40 wins

== Year-end Championships ==
- **(1972 – present)**

#	Titles	Years
8	Martina Navratilova	1978, 1979, 1981, 1983, 1984, 1985, 1986 (x2)
5	Steffi Graf	1987, 1989, 1993, 1995, 1996
5	Serena Williams	2001, 2009, 2012, 2013, 2014
4	Chris Evert	1972, 1973, 1975, 1977
3	Monica Seles	1990, 1991, 1992
3	Kim Clijsters	2002, 2003, 2010

#	Finals
14	Martina Navratilova
8	Chris Evert
7	Serena Williams
6	Steffi Graf
4	Gabriela Sabatini
4	Monica Seles
4	Martina Hingis
4	Lindsay Davenport

#	Semifinals
16	Martina Navratilova
9	Chris Evert
9	Steffi Graf
7	Gabriela Sabatini
7	Serena Williams

#	Appearances
21	Martina Navratilova
13	Chris Evert
13	Steffi Graf
13	Arantxa Sánchez
12	Zina Garrison
12	Conchita Martínez

#	Matches Won
60	Martina Navratilova
34	Chris Evert
31	Steffi Graf
29	Serena Williams
21	Gabriela Sabatini

#	Matches Played
74	Martina Navratilova
43	Chris Evert
38	Steffi Graf
35	Serena Williams
30	Gabriela Sabatini

% *	W–L	Win %
* Minimum 18 Wins

#	Not losing a set	Years
2	Martina Navratilova	1984, 1985
2	Serena Williams	2001, 2012
1	Gabriela Sabatini	1988
1	Kim Clijsters	2002
1	Iga Świątek	2023

== WTA Tier I, Premier Mandatory and Premier 5 ==
- Overall totals include Tier I, Premier Mandatory, and Premier 5 tournaments only.
- Tier I tournaments were played on 3 surfaces, (carpet) ceased as a surface after 1995.

#	Titles
23	Serena Williams
18	Steffi Graf
17	Martina Hingis
14	Maria Sharapova
12	**Iga Świątek**
11	Lindsay Davenport
11	**Aryna Sabalenka**
10	Justine Henin
10	**Victoria Azarenka**
9	Conchita Martínez
9	Monica Seles
9	Venus Williams
9	Simona Halep

#	Finals
33	Serena Williams
27	Martina Hingis
25	Steffi Graf
25	Maria Sharapova
21	Lindsay Davenport
18	Monica Seles
17	Simona Halep
15	Venus Williams
15	Aryna Sabelenka
14	Conchita Martínez
14	Justine Henin
14	Arantxa Sánchez Vicario
14	**Iga Świątek**
14	**Victoria Azarenka**

#	Semifinals
42	Serena Williams
39	Martina Hingis
36	Maria Sharapova
30	Steffi Graf
29	Simona Halep
28	Conchita Martínez
26	Lindsay Davenport
26	Venus Williams
25	/ Monica Seles
24	Jennifer Capriati
24	Elena Dementieva

=== Titles by court type ===
#	Hard
16	Serena Williams
10	**Victoria Azarenka**
9	Maria Sharapova
8	Steffi Graf
8	**Aryna Sabalenka**
8	**Iga Świątek**
7	Venus Williams
6	Monica Seles
6	Kim Clijsters
6	Caroline Wozniacki
6	Petra Kvitová

#	Clay
8	Steffi Graf
8	Conchita Martínez
7	Serena Williams
5	Martina Hingis
5	Justine Henin
5	Maria Sharapova
4	Amélie Mauresmo
4	Gabriela Sabatini
4	**Iga Świątek**
3	Monica Seles
3	Dinara Safina
3	Jelena Janković
3	Petra Kvitová
3	Aryna Sabalenka

=== Match wins/ percentages ===
#	Match wins
265	Serena Williams
220	Maria Sharapova
214	Svetlana Kuznetsova
213	Venus Williams
194	**Victoria Azarenka**
192	Agnieszka Radwańska
189	Martina Hingis
188	Caroline Wozniacki
177	Jelena Janković
172	Simona Halep

	W–L *	Win %
89.63	147–17	Steffi Graf
83.86	265–51	Serena Williams
82.46	94–20	**Iga Świątek**
81.12	189–44	Martina Hingis
80.88	110–26	Justin Henin
80.13	121–30	Monica Seles
78.43	40–11	/ Martina Navratilova
78.42	152–42	Lindsay Davenport
76.12	220–69	Maria Sharapova
75.57	99–32	Kim Clijsters
* minimum 40 wins

== Olympic tournaments ==
(1896–1924, 1988–present) See the Olympic medalists page for the all-time women's medals leaders.

== WTA Prize ==
See WTA Tour records#WTA career prize money leaders. As prize money has increased strongly in recent decades, the lists of prize money leaders all-time and for the WTA Tour period (since 1973) are the same.

== See also ==
- Lists of tennis records and statistics
- Open Era tennis records – Women's singles
- WTA Tour records
- World number 1 women tennis players from 1883–present
- List of WTA number 1 ranked singles tennis players
- List of female tennis players
- All-time tennis records – Men's singles
- ATP Tour records
- Grand Slam (tennis)
- List of tennis tournaments
