= Sakson =

Sakson is a surname. Notable people with the surname include:

- Andrzej Sakson (born 1950), Polish sociologist and historian
- Vladimir Sakson (1927–1988), Soviet Russian artist

== See also ==
- Samson (name)
- Saxon (surname)
