= Saxon (surname) =

Saxon is an English toponymic surname. The name is derived from the Old English Seaxe tun, meaning "Saxon village". People with the surname include:

- Alex Saxon (actor) (born 1987), American actor
- Arthur Saxon (1878–1921), German strongman and circus performer
- Avon Saxon (c. 1857–1909), Canadian opera singer
- Charles Saxon (1920–1988), American cartoonist for The New Yorker
- David S. Saxon (1920–2005), American physicist, educator and President of University of California system
- Edgar J. Saxon (1877–1956), British naturopath and writer
- Edward Saxon (born 1956), American film producer
- Gar Saxon, a fictional Star Wars character in the animated series Star Wars Rebels and Star Wars: The Clone Wars (2008 TV series)
- Henry Saxon (1918–2005), English artist specialising in miniatures
- Isaiah Saxon (born 1983), American film and music video director
- James J. Saxon (1914–1980), 21st Comptroller of the Currency for the United States Department of the Treasury
- James Saxon (actor) (1955–2003), British actor
- James Saxon (American football) (born 1966), American National Football League coach and former running back
- James Saxon (painter) (1772–1819 or later), British portrait painter
- John Saxon (1936–2020), American film and television actor
- John Saxon (educator) (1923–1996), known for developing a new system of mathematics education
- Ken Saxon (1894–1976), New Zealand soldier, cricketer and teacher
- Kurt Saxon (1932–2021), survivalist and author of The Poor Man's James Bond
- Leslie Saxon, Canadian professor of linguistics
- Lulu King Saxon (1852–1927), American painter
- Lyle Saxon (1891–1946), American writer and journalist
- Mack Saxon (c. 1901–1949), American football player, coach of football, basketball and baseball, and college athletic administrator
- Marie Saxon (1904–1941), American actress in vaudeville and theatre
- Mike Saxon (born 1962), American retired National Football League punter
- Nina Saxon (born 1953), American graphic designer
- Richard Saxon (born 1942), British architect
- Rolf Saxon (born 1955), American actor
- Tiber Saxon, a fictional Star Wars character in the animated series Star Wars Rebels
