= Benstead =

Benstead is a surname. Notable people with the surname include:

- Christopher Benstead, British audio engineer
- Graham Benstead (born 1963), British footballer
- John Benstead (trade unionist) (1897–1979), English trade unionist
- Lulu Benstead (1891–1983), Australian opera singer
