= Margaret and Roumania Peters =

American tennis players

- Occupations: Tennis players, schoolteachers
- Margaret Peters
- Born: Margaret Vera Peters; 1915; Washington, D.C., U.S.
- Died: November 3, 2004 (aged 89)
- Education: Tuskegee Institute; New York University; Coppin State University
- Roumania Peters
- Born: Matilda Roumania Peters; 1917; Washington, D.C., U.S.
- Died: May 16, 2003 (aged 85); Cheverly, Maryland, U.S.
- Education: Tuskegee Institute; New York University
- Spouse: James Walker
- Children: 2

Margaret Vera Peters (1915 – November 3, 2004) and Matilda Roumania Peters Walker (1917 – May 16, 2003) were American sisters who played amateur tennis from the 1930s to 1950s. Born and raised in Washington, D.C., they taught themselves how to play tennis at Rose Park in Georgetown, which was one of the few places in the city where they could practice due to racial segregation. They played in events organized by the American Tennis Association (ATA), an organization founded for Black players. Their tennis performances were noticed by a coach from the Tuskegee Institute (now Tuskegee University) and they both received full scholarships.

The sisters gained a reputation as skilled players and won four ATA national tournament doubles championships in a row. They repeated this feat from 1944 to 1953, winning a total of fourteen championships, a record that has never been broken. For this they were nicknamed "Pete" and "Re-Pete". Roumania won two ATA national tournaments, beating tennis legend Althea Gibson in 1946. After the sisters retired from the ATA in the 1950s, they began teaching and coaching.

It was not until late in life Margaret and Roumania's talent was acknowledged by the United States Tennis Association when they were inducted into the Mid-Atlantic Section Hall of Fame in 2003. For many tennis fans, the sisters remain unknown. The Peters have been described as tennis's original sister act and their careers bear resemblance to Venus and Serena Williams if the Williams sisters had not been given the opportunity to play in integrated sports.

== Early life ==
Margaret Vera Peters and Matilda Roumania Peters were sisters born in Washington, D.C., in 1915 and 1917, respectively. The siblings lived at 2710 O Street NW in the city's Georgetown neighborhood. Their working-class parents, George and Fannie, had three additional children, Edith, George, and Alice.

During their youth Margaret and Roumania taught themselves how to play tennis at Rose Park, a public park near their home that was only for Black citizens during racial segregation and one of the few places in the city for them to play tennis. The sisters practiced for hours each day and according to Roumania, the tennis courts were covered with "sand, dirt, rocks, everything" and they "would have to get out there in the morning and pick up the rocks and sweep the line and put some dry lime on there. That's what we played with. We didn't have fancy courts. We learned there."

By the late 1920s the sisters were being mentioned in local newspapers for their tennis activities and represented Rose Park in city-wide tennis tournaments In the early 1930s the pair's tennis skills was described as "outstanding" and they were competing in tournaments held by the American Tennis Association (ATA), an organization founded for Black players when they were not allowed to participate in White tournaments. During this time Margaret attended Dunbar High School and Roumania attended Armstrong High School.

News of the sisters' talent reached Tuskegee Institute (now known as Tuskegee University) tennis coach Cleve Abbott and Margaret was offered a scholarship in 1935. She declined his offer until Roumania finished high school and could attend Tuskegee with her, also on a scholarship. The following year Roumania took part in her first national tournament. She advanced to the finals before being defeated by Lulu Ballard.

== College years ==
Margaret and Roumania began attending Tuskegee in 1937 where they played basketball in addition to tennis. While attending Tuskegee, the sisters gained a reputation as two of the best Black tennis players in the country. Often time opponents were scared to play them due to the sisters' backhands and precision with slice serves and chop shots. Between 1937 and 1941, they won the ATA's national tournament doubles championship four times in a row and Roumania was named Southern Intercollegiate Athletic Conference tennis champion.

Describing their tennis success during college, Roumania stated: "One time [Margaret] would win this tournament; the next time I'd win the tournament. Then the next time she'd win the tournament, then I'd win the next. And so on, and we kept it going like that and every year we still won the doubles. No one in college beat us in the doubles so that's how we reviewed so many so many trophies because we'd each bring about two trophies apiece from the schools." They each graduated from Tuskegee in 1941 with a Bachelor of Science in physical education.

== Later years ==
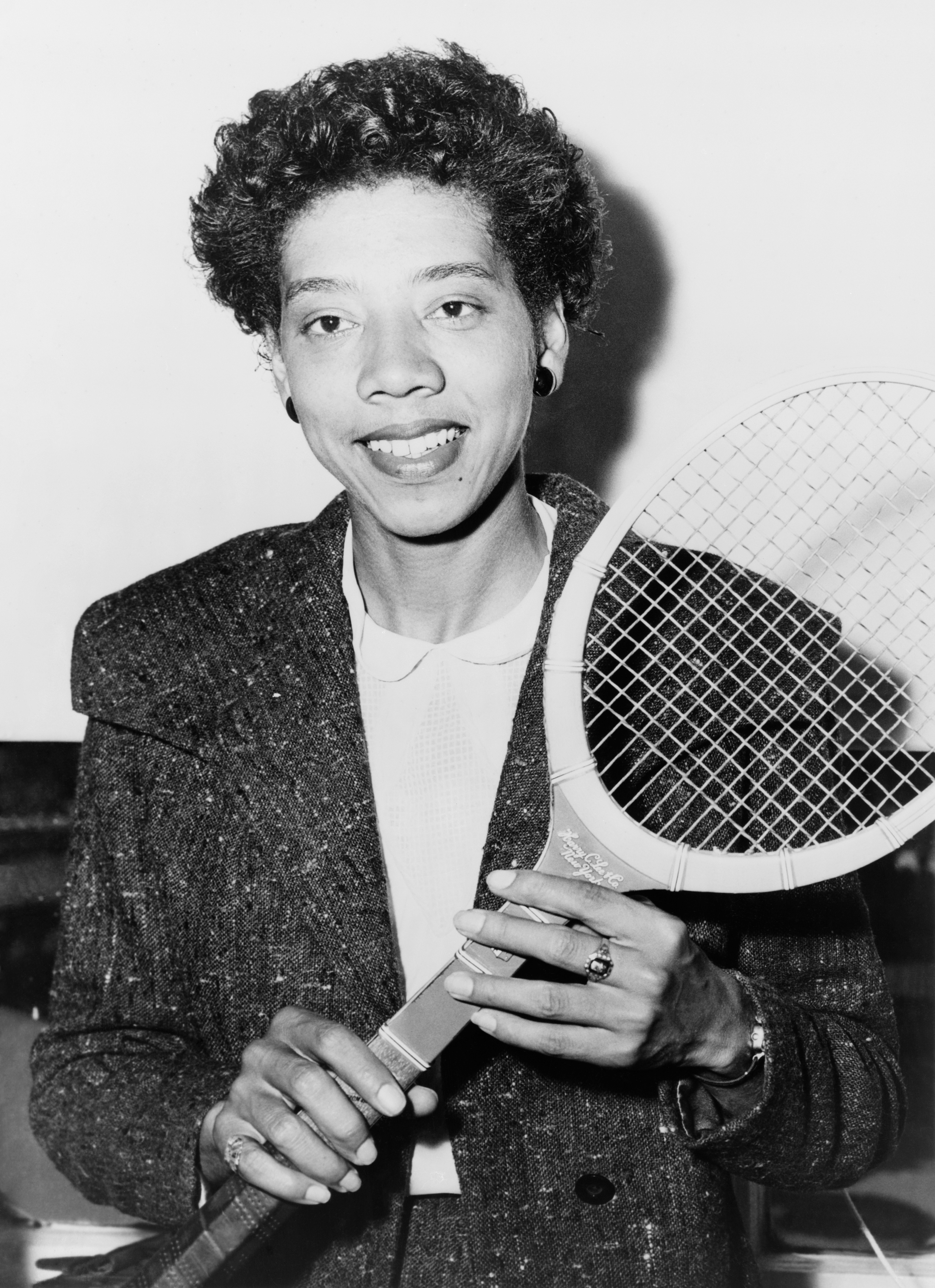
Roumania defeated tennis legend Althea Gibson (pictured) in 1946 to win the American Tennis Association championship title.

After graduating from Tuskegee, Margaret and Roumania attended New York University, both earning a Master's degree in physical education. After this three-year hiatus, they returned to playing in tournaments, winning the ATA national tournament doubles championship ten years in a row between 1944 and 1953 for a total of fourteen years when combined with their earlier four-year wins in college, a record that has never been broken. Due to this, the sisters were nicknamed "Pete" and "Re-Pete" (sometimes spelled "Pete and Repeat"). During that period, Roumania won the ATA championship title in 1944 and 1946. At the August 1946 final match she became the only Black woman to defeat tennis legend Althea Gibson in a major event, winning two of three sets.

The sisters became sports celebrities but made little money at a time when tennis was an amateur sport and were denied the opportunity to play White players. During their tennis careers, the sisters paid for their own transportation, entry fees, and equipment. Their matches were shown in Black cinemas and they met prominent people, including Gene Kelly, who played against them at Rose Park while he was living in Washington, D.C. They also played exhibition matches for members of the British royal family. By the time tennis tournaments began accepting Black players, Margaret and Roumania were already in their mid-to-late 30s when players were expected to retire. After retiring from the ATA in the 1950s, the sisters focused on their teaching careers.

Roumania was a teacher and coach at Tuskegee where she met her husband, James Walker, with whom she had two children, Frances and James. The couple moved to Washington, D.C. and Roumania taught at Howard University before becoming a physical education teacher in the District of Columbia Public Schools system from 1964 to 1981. She also taught at a youth tennis camp for underprivileged Black youth in the city for many years and also coached basketball. Margaret taught in Washington, D.C. as well, working with children with special needs while earning a second Master's degree in special education from Coppin State University.

The sisters were inducted into the Tuskegee University Hall of Fame in 1977. The United States Tennis Association, the organization that banned them from playing during their career, finally acknowledged their achievements in 2003 when Margaret and Roumania were inducted into the Mid-Atlantic Section Hall of Fame. Roumania died from pneumonia on May 16, 2003, at the age of 85, several months before the induction ceremony took place. Margaret died on November 3, 2004, at the age of 89 from Alzheimer's disease.

The sisters were inducted into the Black Tennis Hall of Fame in 2012. Three years later, the Washington, D.C., government renamed the Rose Park tennis courts the Margaret Peters and Roumania Peters Walker Tennis Courts. Among those in attendance at the ceremony, which included installation of a plaque, were Roumania's children, Mayor Muriel Bowser, and Homeland Security Secretary Jeh Johnson. Photographic panels of the sisters were installed at Rose Park in 2017.

== Legacy ==
Journalist Karen Crouse in The New York Times described Margaret and Roumania as "tennis's original sister act". Merlisa Lawrence Corbett wrote in the Bleacher Report the sisters were "forgotten stars" whose "stories, buried beneath the weight of segregation, have existed all along." In Different Strokes: Serena, Venus, and the Unfinished Black Tennis Revolution, author Cecil Harris lamented the fact the sisters never had a chance to play at the US Open, Wimbledon, or the French Open due to racist policies. In Charging the Net: A History of Blacks in Tennis from Althea Gibson and Arthur Ashe to the Williams Sisters, authors Cecil Harris and Larryette Kyle-DeBose also called Margaret and Roumania "tennis's original Sister Act" and that they were "denied a chance to be considered the world's finest double team" due to racial discrimination in sports. They have been described as people who "dominated the national tennis scene from the late 1930s into the early 1950s and forged a path for other black players" including Venus and Serena Williams whom Margaret and Roumania loved to watch, but are unknown by many tennis fans. When the Williams sisters won their first Wimbledon titles, Roumania's daughter told Margaret that they should have been given that opportunity, but Margaret responded "No. It's their turn now."

== See also ==
- African Americans in sports
- Women's tennis in the United States
