= Lulu Wang =

Lulu Wang or Wang Lulu may refer to:

- Lulu Wang (filmmaker) (born 1983, 王子逸, Wang Ziyi), Chinese-born American filmmaker
- Lulu Wang (novelist) (born 1960, 王露露, Wang Lulu), Chinese-born novelist who lived in the Netherlands
- Lulu Wang (engineer), biomedical engineer, educated in New Zealand, has worked in New Zealand, China, the US, South Africa, and Iceland
- Wang Lulu (王露露), wife of Neil Heywood, a British businessman in China
- Wang Lulu (王璐璐), a competitor on the 2009 edition of the Chinese talent show Super Girl (TV series)
