= Everett report =

New York State Assembly report

The Everett Report of 1922 was a New York State Assembly report compiled by a legislative commission led by Edward A. Everett. It concluded that "the Iroquois were fraudulently dispossessed of over six million acres of land in New York." However, the report was "buried" by New York State and not published until 1971.

== Formation ==
A meeting was held with support from the Onondaga Historical Association in Syracuse, New York, in March 1919. The meeting advocated for improving the quality of Native American life in the state and specifically called for action by the New York State Legislature to do this. The United States Court of Appeals for the Second Circuit held in March the following year that New York could not dispossess a Native tribe of their land on the grounds that groups such as the Oneida people, a founding nation of the Haudenosaunee (Iroquois) Confederacy, were federally recognized and such an action would require federal approval. After this decision, the New York State Assembly set out to more clearly define the role of New York State versus the role of the federal government in Native affairs.

The New York State Assembly formed the New York State Legislative Commission (better known as the Everett Commission) with the stated purpose of studying "the history, the affairs and transactions had by the people of the state of New York with the Indian tribes resident in the state and to report to the legislature the status of the American Indian residing in said state of New York". The commission was also tasked with investigating Laura Cornelius "Minnie" Kellogg, a member of the Oneida tribe who advocated for the rights of the Haudenosaunee to possess their own land. A commission was formed with Edward A. Everett as the chairman. Other members included the Attorney General of New York, three state senators, five assemblymen, and an employee from the New York State Department of Health, Department of Education (Arthur C. Parker), Department of Charities, and David R. Hill, a Haudenosaunee chief.

== Investigation ==
Beginning in August 1920, Everett led a series of investigations around the state. The commission traveled to all of New York's Haudenosaunee reservations and the Six Nations of the Grand River reservation in Ontario, Canada. Everett sought to visit the reservations another time, but his request was denied by the legislature, which similarly did not offer funding for Natives to travel to Albany and attend conferences. Lulu G. Stillman was the Everett Commission's stenographer and a researcher. Historian Laurence M. Hauptman credits the report as being "largely the work of Lulu Stillman".

== Report ==
The Everett report was finalized in early 1922. On February 24, Everett previewed his report in the New York State Capitol, to a group of at least thirty-one people, including both natives and whites. The report was sent to the assembly on April 22. The report was 420 pages long. It concluded that:

the Indians of the State of New York are entitled to all of the territory ceded to them by the treaty made with the Colonial Government prior to the Revolutionary War, relative to the territory that should be ceded to the Indians for their loyalty to said colonies and by the treaty of 1784 by which said promise by the colonists was consummated by the new Republic known as the United States of America and in a speech by General [George] Washington to the conference of Indians comprising the Six Nations and recognizing the Indians as a Nation.

The report concluded that the Haudenosaunee had a legal right to 6,000,000 acres (2,400,000 ha) of land in New York as a result of treaties signed in the late 18th century, specifically the 1784 Treaty of Fort Stanwix. Only Everett signed it, the assembly rejected the report, and it was not widely printed or distributed. The United States Federal Government took no action and "misfiled" the copy it held.

== Legacy ==
Some Haudenosaunee, including Minnie Kellogg, increased their activism for land rights after the report. However, the report itself was "buried" by the legislature and was only released through the efforts of Stillman, who had kept a copy, in 1971.

Clinton Rickard, a chief of the Tuscarora people, wrote in his autobiography that he "closely" followed Everett's work, was present at Everett's February preview, and that he considered it both "highly favorable to the Six Nations" and a "great wrong" that the legislature rejected it for being "too favorable to Indian claims".

In 1927 a class action lawsuit was filed by a Mohawk named James Deere against the Saint Lawrence Power Company and several others that occupied a 1 square mile (2.6 km^{2}) portion of land. The case was dismissed.

In 1988 Hauptman wrote that Natives in New York cite the report and its subsequent suppression as evidence that New York State worked against justice for native peoples. He continued to write that, with the exception of the Everett Report, Native claims would not be taken seriously until 1974 by New York politicians.

== Bibliography ==
- Vecsey, Christopher; Starna, William A. (1988). Iroquois Land Claims. Syracuse University Press. ISBN 978-0-8156-2434-9.
- Hauptman, Laurence M. (1981). The Iroquois and the New Deal. Syracuse, N.Y.: Syracuse University Press. ISBN 978-0-8156-2247-5.
- Hauptman, Laurence M. (2016). The Oneida Indian in Foreign Waters. Syracuse University Press.
- Rickard, Clinton (1973). Fighting Tuscarora : the autobiography of Chief Clinton Rickard. Syracuse University Press. ISBN 978-0-8156-0092-3.
- Hauptman, Laurence M. (1988). Formulating American Indian policy in New York State, 1970-1986. State University of New York Press. ISBN 978-0-88706-754-9.
