= Lulu G. Stillman =

Advocate for Native Americans (c.1881–1969)

- Born: Lulu Glominski; 1881/1882; Brooklyn, New York, US
- Died: July 4, 1969 (aged 87-88); Troy, New York, US
- Burial place: Oakwood Cemetery
- Occupations: Stenographer; Researcher; Advocate
- Employer: Edward A. Everett
- Organization: New York State Legislative Commission
- Known for: Advocate for Native Americans
- Notable work: Everett report
- Spouse: Ernest E. Stillman (1904-1921)
- Children: 1

Lulu G. Stillman (1881/1882 – July 4, 1969) was an American advocate for Native Americans. She worked as a stenographer and researcher to produce the Everett report, which concluded that the Iroquois had a legal right to 6,000,000 acres (2,400,000 ha) of land in New York, in the 1920s and preserved the report after it was rejected by the New York State Assembly. She subsequently became a prominent advocate on behalf of the Iroquois Nation, helping to defeat the Indian Reorganization Act in New York.

== Biography ==
Stillman was born to Anthony Glominski and Louisa VonKirchfield Glominski in Brooklyn, New York. In her later life, Stillman lived in Troy, New York.

From 1919 to 1922 she was the stenographer and chief researcher of the Everett Commission under Edward A. Everett. Historian Laurence M. Hauptman credits the report, which concluded that the Iroquois had a legal right to 6,000,000 acres (2,400,000 ha) of land in New York as a result of treaties signed in the late 18th century, as being "largely the work of Lulu Stillman". The report was only signed by Everett himself, never formally submitted to the state legislature, and was not widely published or distributed. Stillman typed a copy of the commission's minutes that Everett kept with himself. She preserved copies for the duplication of the minutes as well as its conclusions.

After the commission was ended in 1922, Stillman continued her advocacy with and for the Iroquois. In 1922 she was hired by the Iroquois to research the 1784 Treaty of Fort Stanwix. She was a spokesperson of the tribes and negotiated with various governmental agencies. In July 1934, the Tuscarora Nation adopted her into the Beaver Clan and gave her the name "Yon-dio-che-yoo", or "true friend". She became a major critic of John Collier and the Indian Reorganization Act (IRA) of 1934 and was noted for having "distrust" in the intentions of both New York state and the federal government. Stillman maintained that instead of new legislation, such as the IRA, treaties that had been signed long before should be honored.

On April 16, 1934, Stillman published an open letter addressed to Iroquois leaders that criticized the IRA as legislation that would not actually help Native tribes and warned of a movement that would seek to "allot your lands and that means taxes in the future, citizenship and loss of the little lands that remain in your inheritance." Hauptman describes her by the 1930s as "the most respected outsider in Iroquois political circles who had supported the long crusade to win their lands back". Her work, along with that of Alice Lee Jemison, has been credited with "killing" the IRA in New York.

Also in 1934, C. C. Daniels, the special assistant to New York Attorney General Homer Stille Cummings, met with Stillman. He then sent his nephew, James Griffith, to talk to her as well. Griffith made three copies of the Everett report that Stillman had preserved from September to November, adding a five-page introduction. Copies were sent to the United States Department of the Interior and to the United States Department of Justice. Both copies were misplaced or lost until at least the early 1970s, while Stillman kept careful track of hers and did not loan the copy out.

Stillman also worked for the Rensselaer Polytechnic Institute as a secretary or bookkeeper.

The Everett report was not published until 1971, from a copy that was preserved by Stillman. She donated her papers to Helen Upton who was researching the report and eventually published a book on it.

== Personal life ==
Stillman was married to Ernest E. Stillman, a dentist, around 1904, until she applied for divorce in 1921. The couple had one daughter. Stillman attended the Christ Methodist Church. She died in Troy on July 4, 1969, and was buried at Oakwood Cemetery.

== Bibliography ==
- Hauptman, Laurence M. (1981). The Iroquois and the New Deal. Syracuse University Press. ISBN 978-0-8156-2247-5.
- Hauptman, Laurence M. (2016). The Oneida Indian in Foreign Waters. Syracuse University Press.
- Upton, Helen M (1980). The Everett report in historical perspective: the Indians of New York. New York State American Revolution Bicentennial Commission. OCLC 6334964.
