= Jimmie McDaniel =

American tennis player

- Full name: Jimmie Pierce McDaniel
- Country (sports): United States
- Born: 4 September 1919 Greenville, Alabama, United States
- Died: 8 March 1990 (age 76) Los Angeles, California, United States
- Height: 6 ft 5 or 1.95m
- Turned pro: 1939 (amateur tour)
- Retired: 1954
- Plays: Left handed

Singles
- Career record: 66–8
- Career titles: 10

Jimmie Pierce McDaniel (September 4, 1916 – March 8, 1990) was an African-American tennis player. He won the American Tennis Association, ATA National Championships event four times (1939–1941, 1946). He was said to be the "greatest black player of the pre-war (WWII) era." He was a lefty and was about 6 ft 5 in tall.

He was active from 1939 to 1954 and won 10 career singles titles.

== Biography ==
McDaniel was born on 4 September 1919 in Greenville, Alabama, United States. Jimmie was raised in Los Angeles where he attended Manual Arts High School. His father Willis McDaniel was a former baseball player in the Negro leagues who worked as a railroad porter in Los Angeles; his mother, Ruby McDaniel, worked as a domestic six days a week to put food on the table. When Willis died, his wife, Ruby (Harrison) McDaniel, was left to care for their seven young children.

Jimmie picked up tennis in elementary school, hitting balls against a backboard or practicing on the school’s sole dirt court. He never had a lesson and never played a junior tournament. At Manual Arts High School in Los Angeles, he focused on track and field until his senior year, when he joined the previously all-white tennis team and led it to the league championship. Although the only Black player on his high school's tennis squad, McDaniel was the highest ranked player at the school. In 1935, McDaniel played a practice match against a fellow Los Angeles high school student Bobby Riggs, who was then the top-ranked junior player in the country, and who would go on to win Wimbledon in 1939 and the U.S. Nationals in 1939 and 1941. (He is best remembered for losing to Billie Jean King in what was billed as the “Battle of the Sexes,” at the Houston Astrodome in 1973.) At the time of the match Riggs was ranked as the number one junior player in the country and McDaniel had only been playing for two years. McDaniel lost, 7–5, 13–11, in the hotly contested battle.

McDaniel continued his tennis career by winning the 1938 Southern California Men's Singles Open title and share the Double's title with his brother Al McDaniel.

In 1938, at age 22, McDaniel, recruited by Olympian Ralph Metcalfe, was awarded a track scholarship to Xavier University of Louisiana in New Orleans — he was a powerful runner who had once leapt 6 feet 4 ½ inches to win the Southern California scholastic high-jump title — but he quickly found his way to the tennis courts instead. During his tenure at Xavier University McDaniel would win numerous championships among the then-segregated ranks of black tennis players. Banned from the NCAA Championships, he dominated a Black-college circuit that included schools like Tuskegee, Hampton, and Prairie View.

In the spring of 1939, still as a college freshman, he became the National Open Men's Singles Champion, and shared the Doubles title with his schoolmate, Richard Cohen.

Between 1939 and 1941, McDaniel would win the Singles title at Prairie View Intercollegiate, the Southwestern Open, the North Carolina Open, the Eastern Sectional Open, the Southern Intercollegiate Sectionals, the New York Open, and the American Tennis Association National Tournament.

Paired with Richard Cohen, they would win the Doubles title at the North Carolina Open, the South Carolina Open, the Eastern Sectional Open, and the New York Open. They would go on to win the National Doubles title in 1939 but were upset in the semi-finals in 1940. Cohen had previously held the title in 1938. McDaniel would again win the National Singles title in 1941.

He would finish his collegiate career at Xavier University in 1942.

=== Match against Don Budge ===
On July 29, 1940, McDaniel would unofficially break tennis' color barrier by participating in an exhibition match against Don Budge, winner of the Grand Slam in 1938, that received wide attention. At the time, The Cosmopolitan Club in Harlem served as the headquarters of the American Tennis Association (ATA) — home to the nation’s Black players—and the Budge-McDaniel exhibition was held there in conjunction with an ATA tournament. For the first time since tennis arrived in the United States six decades earlier, a white player and a Black player met in a top-level match. Two-thousand people crammed the club’s stands to capacity while others leaned out windows and crowded onto the fire escapes that overlooked the court. Those who didn’t have a view could hear the score called on a public-address system. Prominent tennis writer Al Laney was on hand for the occasion, and he praised Budge for “performing an important service for the good of the game.” Budge won the match 6–1, 6–2. Although hailed as a step forward for Black tennis players, the event would all but be forgotten with the onset of World War II. It would be another 10 years before Althea Gibson took the next step by integrating tennis at the United States National Championships (now the US Open) at Forest Hills, in 1950.

McDaniel competed in tournaments for another decade but often faced discrimination. Sometimes he was denied entry into the draw; at other times he was given incorrect directions to the club so that he would arrive late and be forced to forfeit his match. With no way to move up in the sport, McDaniel quit, taking up golf and later bowling.

After World War II broke out, McDaniel returned to Los Angeles and went to work at the Lockheed aircraft plant. He began as a janitor and retired 30 years later as a line supervisor.

McDaniel would return to the tennis courts in the late 1950s. By then he was allowed to walk into white clubs and enter USTA events, and he eventually earned a Top 20 national ranking in the 60-and-overs. He also gave lessons to adults and children.

== Personal life ==
When he was 18, McDaniel fell in love with a 15-year-old white classmate, and she became pregnant. For his transgression, he was forced to spend a year in a reformatory and was banned from returning to Southern California for an additional year. But his passion for tennis never waned. McDaniel married Audrey Williams, a middle school math teacher, in 1940; they divorced in 1954, and she died in 1981. Their five children — Jimmie Jr., Rosalind, Willis, Kenneth and Audrey — lived with their mother, only seeing their father three or four times a year. Jimmie’s marriage to Dorothy Adams lasted until she died of a brain aneurysm. In 1977, he married Eastlynn Clark; she died in 2009.

Jimmie died of pneumonia in Los Angeles on March 8, 1990. He was 73. He was inducted posthumously into the Black Tennis Hall of Fame in 2009.

== Accolades ==
- ATA National Men’s Singles title in 1939, 1940, 1941 and 1946
- ATA National Men’s Doubles title in 1939 and 1941 with his college teammate Dr. Richard Cohen
- ATA National Men’s Doubles title in 1946 with James Stocks
- ATA National Men’s Doubles title in 1952 with Earthna Jacquet
