= Doug Coombs (geologist) =

New Zealand geologist (1924–2016)

Doug Coombs CNZM
- Born: Douglas Saxon Coombs; 23 November 1924; Dunedin, New Zealand
- Died: 23 December 2016 (aged 92); Dunedin, New Zealand
- Education: University of Cambridge
- Spouse: Anne Tarrant
- Children: 3
- Relatives: Ken Saxon (uncle)
- Awards: Hector Medal (1969); Companion of the New Zealand Order of Merit (2002)
- Scientific career
- Workplaces: University of Otago
- Thesis: Incipient metamorphism of the tuffs and greywackes of the Taringatura Survey District, Southland, New Zealand; Studies on the determination of low-temperature alkali feldspars (1952)

Douglas Saxon Coombs CNZM (23 November 1924 – 23 December 2016) was a New Zealand mineralogist and petrologist.

== Early life and family ==
Born in the Dunedin suburb of St Clair on 23 November 1924, Coombs was the son of architect Leslie Douglas Coombs and Nellie Vera von Tunzelmann Coombs (née Saxon), and the nephew of Ken Saxon. He was educated at King's High School, and played cricket for Otago in the 1942–43 season as a right-hand batsman and leg-break bowler.

Coombs went on to study at the University of Otago, graduating with a Bachelor of Science degree in 1946 and Master of Science with first-class honours in 1948. He then studied at the University of Cambridge, where he was awarded a PhD in 1952.

== Career ==
First appointed an assistant lecturer in geology at Otago in 1947, Coombs became a professor in 1956. He retired in 1989 and was granted the title of professor emeritus.

Coombs was noted for his studies of the rocks of the southern South Island of New Zealand. The mineral species coombsite, K(Mn^{2+}, Fe^{2+}, Mg)_{13}(Si, Al)_{18}O_{42}(OH)_{14}, is named for him.

He was elected a Fellow of the Royal Society of New Zealand in 1962, and in 1969 he won the society's Hector Medal, at that time New Zealand's highest science prize. He received the Mineralogical Society of America Award in 1963. In the 2002 New Year Honours, Coombs was appointed a Companion of the New Zealand Order of Merit, for services to mineralogy.

== Personal life ==
Coombs and his wife Anne (née Tarrant) had two sons and a daughter. He died in Dunedin on 23 December 2016, aged 92.

== See also ==
- List of Otago representative cricketers
