= Edgar George Brown =

American civil rights advocate and tennis player

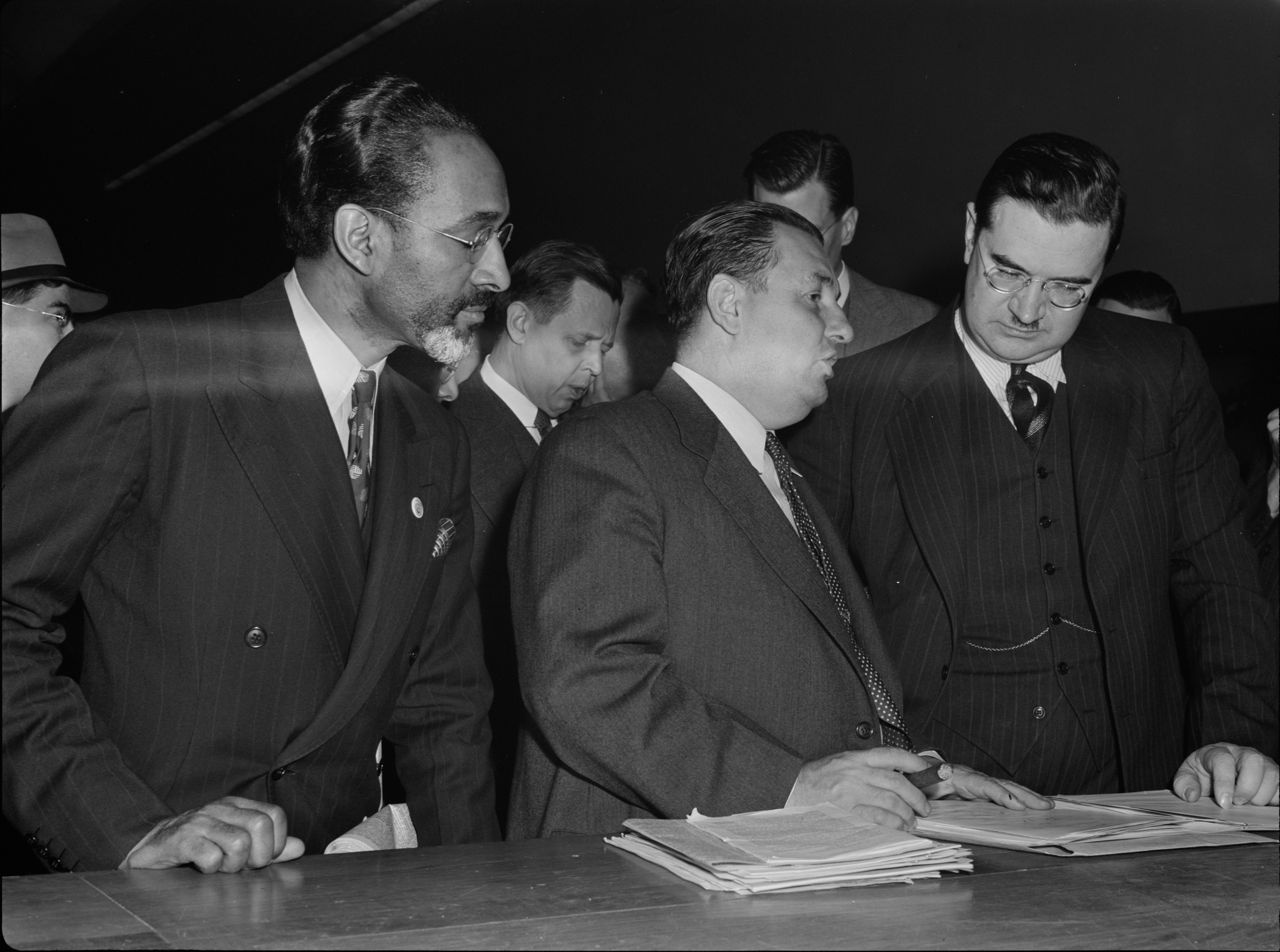
Edgar G. Brown (left) with Leon Henderson and Donald Gordon in the early 1940s

Edgar George Brown (1898–1954) was a civil rights advocate, tennis player, union organizer, and politician in the United States. He was active in the Adams Morgan neighborhood of Northwest Washington, D.C., where he was a lobbyist and advocate for low paid African American laborers.

He was born in Sandoval, Illinois. He was a four-time American Tennis Association champion (1922, 1923, 1928 and 1929). He was known as a master of topspin. He was one of the founders of the National Lawn Tennis Association.

He was a member of Franklin D. Roosevelt's Black Cabinet, a founding member of the National Negro Council, and the United Government Employees Union. In July 1941, Brown staged a one-person sit-down strike in Washington National Airport's main coffee shop after being refused a cup because of his being Black.
