= Lulu Kunkel Burg =

American violinist

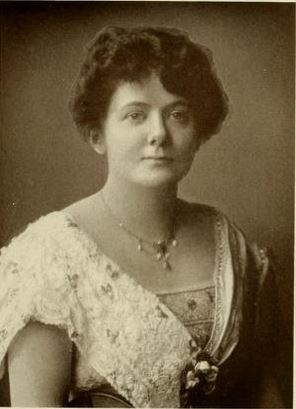
Lulu Kunkel Burg, Kajiwara Photo

Lulu Kunkel Burg (December 3, 1876 – September 11, 1953) was for six years the first violinist of the St. Louis Symphony Society, as well as the only woman who ever played in this capacity for that organization up until her time. Following this engagement she was their soloist on different occasions.

== Biography ==
Lulu Kunkel Burg was born in Cincinnati on December 3, 1876, to William Kunkel and Lena Frederick. Her grandparents had moved to St. Louis when she was about seven. Her uncle, Oscar Frederick, who was a violinist noticed her talent for music helped her to develop her talents. She came to live with her grandparents a year later and they bought her a violin, so she could make herself independent. She became a student of Otto Knaeble who led the Grand Opera House orchestra, from the time she was eight until she was seventeen.

Her first public appearance was before the Y. M. C. A. in 1885; after that she played before different lodges and churches. For some of these she received five dollars. While Ovide Musin was in St. Louis on a concert tour, she was sent to play before him to get an opinion as to whether she ought to have further advantages. He advised that after some time she would be benefited by a course in one of the European conservatories. When the time came, her uncle could not afford to do this, so some of the musicians Robyn, Kroeger, Epstein and G. A. Buder — arranged for a testimonial concert which netted her about $600. This paid the expenses of the journey, and she entered the conservatory in Brussels.

Lulu Kunkel Burg was a pupil of Eugène Ysaÿe, for four years, in the Conservatoire Royal de Musique, Brussels, Belgium. She was one of the winners of the first prize among forty students. When she returned to America she became a pupil of Max Bendix for six months, who was engaged by the World's Fair officials. A recital at Memorial Hall was her first venture in concert work after her European study. This was immediately followed by an engagement as first violinist with the St. Louis Symphony Society, where she remained six years. When Max Zach was made director he had adverse opinions about women being engaged with such a great number of men and declared himself very frankly, which ended the engagement.

As a soloist she appeared at many notable clubs in St. Louis, beginning her public appearance at the age of eight years. She also gave concerts and assisted in those given by the Symphony Society, Morning Choral, Liederkranz, Rubinstein and Friday Clubs, as well as playing in private homes, which was one of her special lines of work. She is known for technical playing and originality in interpretation. Her playing was noted to be very evocative of emotion at a time where the inclusion of women in orchestra was argued for due to belief that the participation of women would increase sensitiveness and expression in the performances.

Lulu Kunkel Burg was a teacher of violin for twelve years at Forest Park University, and for the same time violinist of the First Presbyterian Church. She also taught in the Missouri Conservatory for five years. Burg was very successful as a teacher at the Forest Park University, of which Anna Sneed Cairns was the president. At the First Presbyterian Church she played every Sunday morning and evening. With her in this work, outside of the regular choir, was Wilhelmina Lowe-Speyer, who was for many years the harpist for the St. Louis Symphony Society, and later played in the orchestra of which her husband was the leader at the Columbia Theatre.

Just before Burg's marriage she was offered a position in New York on the vaudeville stage by H. M. Blossom, Jr., the author of Yankee Consul, Checkers and other plays. It was a great temptation, but she rejected the offer and married Frederick Henry Burg (1870-1937) in February, 1902. Frederick Burg and Philip Burg were in the grocery business on South Broadway, St. Louis. They had one daughter, Virginia B. Klaus (b. 1908).

Burg included in her repertoire selections from Wagner, Wieniawski, Saint-Saens, Bruch, Lalo, Mendelssohn and other great composers.

She died on September 11, 1953, and is buried at Bellefontaine Cemetery, St. Louis.
