= Laurence M. Hauptman =

American historian

Laurence M. Hauptman was an American historian and Distinguished Professor Emeritus of History at SUNY New Paltz. He was an expert on Native American history, specifically the Iroquois in the 19th and 20th centuries.

== Biography ==
Hauptman attended New York University (NYU), where he received a PhD in history. He became interested in Iroquois history while a graduate student when he read The Death and Rebirth of the Seneca by Anthony F. C. Wallace. Hauptman began researching the people and found "a gap in the historical literature" after 1815, and sought to "fill in that gap by writing 19th and 20th century Haudenosaunee history." Bayrd Still mentored Hauptman at NYU, where he wrote a master's essay on the Dawes Act and contemporary Native policies that was finished by 1968.

Hauptman began teaching at the State University of New York at New Paltz in 1971. On September 22, 1999, the SUNY Board of Trustees made Hauptman a Distinguished Professor, the highest rank in the SUNY system for teachers. He worked for the Adirondack Museum, New York State Museum, and Rochester Museum and Science Center as a historian, and served as an expert witness in several cases on Native Americans, testifying to the United States Congress in 1990 about the Seneca Nation Settlement Act. He also consulted with several native tribes and taught at various universities, including NYU, the University of New Mexico, and Saint Bonaventure University's graduate school. From at least 1989 to 1999 he edited the Iroquois Book Series of Syracuse University Press.

Hauptman passed away on June 23, 2026 in New Paltz, New York.

== Partial bibliography ==
- Conspiracy of Interests: Iroquois Dispossession and the Rise of New York State (1999) ISBN 978-0-585-24811-0
- The Iroquois and the New Deal (1981) ISBN 978-0-8156-2247-5
- The Iroquois in the Civil War (1993) ISBN 978-0-8156-0272-9
- Tribes and Tribulations: Misconceptions about American Indians and Their History (1995) ISBN 978-0-8263-1581-6
- Between Two Fires: American Indians in the Civil War (1995) ISBN 978-0-02-914180-9
- Formulating American Indian Policy in New York State, 1970-1986 (1988) ISBN 978-0-585-05525-1
- Chief Daniel Bread and the Oneida Nation of Indians of Wisconsin (with L. Gordon McLester III) (2002) ISBN 978-0-8061-3412-3
- The Iroquois Struggle for Survival: World War II to Red Power (1986) ISBN 978-0-8156-2349-6
- The Tonawanda Senecas' heroic battle against removal : conservative activist Indians (2011) ISBN 9781441697868
- The Pequots in southern New England : the fall and rise of an American Indian nation (1990) ISBN 978-0-585-14540-2
- An Oneida Indian in foreign waters : the life of Chief Chapman Scanandoah, 1870-1953 (2016) ISBN 978-0-8156-5387-5
- In the shadow of Kinzua : the Seneca nation of indians since World War II (2013) ISBN 978-0-8156-5238-0
- Seven generations of Iroquois leadership : the Six Nations since 1800 (2008) ISBN 978-0-8156-3165-1

He also edited works including The Oneida Indian Experience: Two Perspectives (with Jack Campisi, 1988, ISBN 978-0-8156-2453-0), The Oneida Indian Journey: From New York to Wisconsin, 1784-1860 (with Gordon McLester III).
