= American Tennis Association =

American Tennis organization for African-Americans during Segregation

- Sport: Tennis
- Abbreviation: (ATA)
- Founded: 1916
- Location: Largo, Maryland

Official website
- www.yourata.org
- (United States)

The American Tennis Association (ATA) is based in Largo, Maryland, outside Washington, D.C., and is the oldest African-American sports organization in the United States. The core of the ATA's modern mission continues to be promoting tennis as a sport for black people and developing junior tennis players, but the ATA welcomes people of all backgrounds.

== History ==
By the early 1890s, despite the association of tennis with upper-class whites, the sport began to attract athletes at black colleges and universities, such as the Tuskegee Institute and Howard University. Because the sport was segregated, blacks established their own tennis clubs around the Baltimore and Washington, D.C., areas to encourage players and create competitions, including Baltimore's Monumental Tennis Club and Washington, D.C.'s Association Tennis Club.

In response to the USTA prohibition against black players in their tournaments, a group of African-American businessmen, college professors, and physicians founded the ATA in Washington on November 30, 1916. Their initial mission statement was to build the infrastructure for black tennis tournaments, to unite black players and fans, and to promote the game within African-American communities. The founders are listed as: Dr. Harry S. McCard, Dr. William H. Wright, Dr. B.M. Rhetta, Ralph Cook, Henry Freeman, and Tally Holmes.

In early tournaments hosted by the ATA, such popular black players as Margaret and Roumania Peters, James Trouman, and Emanuel McDuffle competed. The first ATA National Championships were held the following August at Druid Hill Park in Baltimore, with competitions in men's singles, women's singles, and men's doubles. The earliest tournament recorded might be in early August 1922 at the Germantown, PA YWCA being billed as the "American Tennis Association National Championship Tennis Tournament.

The ATA partnered with prominent black colleges and universities to host their tournaments. This ensured that the tournaments could provide the court time and housing for players and officials, particularly in the Jim Crow South where blacks were excluded from many public facilities and hotels. The colleges and clubs also had facilities for banquet halls and the types of large spaces that enabled the players and fans to organize politically around other issues, and provided space for high-profile events where the universities cultivated donors.

In the 1940s, there was a now famous match between Don Budge, the "white" singles champion at the time, and Jimmie McDaniel, the black champion at the time. Held in Harlem, July 29, 1940, at the Cosmopolitan Tennis Club, in front of a capacity crowd of more than 2,000 patrons. Budge won [6-1, 6-2], but the color-barrier had been broken. Even Althea Gibson had quite a bit of involvement with the organization.

== 21st century ATA ==
Since 2013, the ATA has been negotiating with the City of Fort Lauderdale and Broward County to build a national training center and home for the Black Tennis Hall of Fame. The city and county were selected because of the preeminence of Sistrunk Boulevard, a historically black neighborhood. The interior of the Hall of Fame is slated to be designed by a Grand Slam champion.

As an effort to secure and maintain a lasting presence online, Rocky Warner a certified tennis coach in Atlanta, Georgia and creative marketing designer volunteered to design, develop and maintain the ATA website. Warner rebranded the ATA Logo (see image below) that currently represents the National Tournament that takes place in the summer. Through the development of the website, Mr. Warner would sit on the executive board as he presented by-laws to the executive committee to represent the Southern Region of the ATA, known as the ATA SOUTH. (https://www.atasouth.org)

Warner's efforts to unify the black tennis south under the ATA SOUTH has been slow as he first needed to build a grassroots youth tennis program in Atlanta. Sugar Creek Golf & Tennis is the home to the ATA SOUTH and the only facility in Georgia with over 100 active black youth learning, training and competing within USTA team tennis, tournament play, Atlanta Lawn Tennis Association league play, UTR, WTN and ATA Regional Rally's. Warner has successfully directed ATA sanctioned tournaments and WTN events.

As part of the USTA’s partnership with the ATA, the National Campus will welcome the National Championships to its ground at least once every three to four years.

The 101st American Tennis Association National Championships were played at the USTA National Campus between July 28 – August 4, 2018, with the final results posted.

The 102nd American Tennis Association National Championships were played in Fort Lauderdale in 2021.

== Championships ==
First held in August 1917 at Druid Hill Park in Baltimore.

The list of champions below was compiled from the ATA Past Champions web pages.

=== Men's singles ===
- 1917 Tally Holmes
- 1918 Tally Holmes
- 1919 Sylvester Smith
- 1920 Bertrand Clark
- 1921 Tally Holmes
- 1922 Edgar George Brown
- 1923 Edgar George Brown
- 1924 Tally Holmes
- 1925 Ted Thompson
- 1926 Eyre Saitch
- 1927 Ted Thompson
- 1928 Edgar George Brown
- 1929 Edgar George Brown
- 1930 Douglas Turner
- 1931 Reginald Weir
- 1932 Reginald Weir
- 1933 Reginald Weir
- 1934 Nathaniel Jackson
- 1935 Franklin Jackson
- 1936 Lloyd Scott
- 1937 Reginald Weir
- 1938 Franklin Jackson
- 1939 Jimmie McDaniel
- 1940 Jimmie McDaniel
- 1941 Jimmie McDaniel
- 1942 Reginald Weir
- 1943 Canceled due to World War II
- 1944 Lloyd Scott
- 1945 Lloyd Scott
- 1946 Jimmie McDaniel
- 1947 George Stewart
- 1948 George Stewart
- 1949 Event not played
- 1950 Oscar Johnson
- 1951 George Stewart
- 1952 George Stewart
- 1953 George Stewart
- 1954 Earthna Jacquet
- 1955 Robert Ryland
- 1956 Robert Ryland
- 1957 George Stewart
- 1958 Wilbert Davis
- 1959 Wilbert Davis
- 1960 Arthur Ashe, Jr.
- 1961 Arthur Ashe, Jr.
- 1962 Arthur Ashe, Jr.
- 1963 Wilbert Davis
- 1964 George Stewart
- 1965 Luis Glass
- 1966 Wilbert Davis
- 1967 Wilbert Davis
- 1968 Robert Binns
- 1969 Marty Gool
- 1970 Gene Fluri
- 1971 John Wilkerson
- 1972 Horace Reid
- 1973 Arthur Carrington
- 1974 Roger Guedes
- 1975 Benny Sims
- 1976 Terrance Jackson
- 1977 Terrance Jackson
- 1978 Rodney Harmon
- 1979 Warrick Jones
- 1980 Kevin Belcher
- 1981 Kevin Belcher
- 1982 Warrick Jones
- 1983 Adrian Clark
- 1984 Young Kwon
- 1985 Phil Williamson
- 1986 Juan Farrow
- 1987 Phil Williamson
- 1988 Noel Rutherford
- 1989 Gerard Gbedey
- 1990 Vince Mackey
- 1991 Phil Williamson
- 1992 Steve Campbell
- 1993 Steve Campbell
- 1994 Billy Ball
- 1995 Vince Mackey
- 1996 Donovan September
- 1997 Phil Williamson
- 1998 Mark Silva
- 1999 Not held due to litigation.
- 2000 Tourne Neblett
- 2001 Donovan September
- 2002 Steve Campbell
- 2003 Steve Campbell
- 2004 H’Cone Thompson
- 2005 H’Cone Thompson
- 2006 Phillip Graham Benjamin
- 2007 Not available
- 2008 Kenneth Myers
- 2009 Joe Cadogan
- 2010 Julian Sullivan
- 2011 Justin Byrd
- 2012 Vincenzo Ciccone
- 2013 Kenneth Myers
- 2014 Tontine Urhobo Jr.
- 2015 John McLean
- 2016 Junior Ore
- 2017 Mwendwa Mbithi
- 2018 Rodney Carey
- 2019 Bjorn Munroe
- 2020 no tournament due to COVID-19 pandemic

=== Women's singles ===
- 1917 Lucy Diggs Slowe
- 1918 May Rae
- 1919 May Rae
- 1920 May Rae
- 1921 Lucy Diggs Slowe
- 1922 Isadore Channels
- 1923 Isadore Channels
- 1924 Isadore Channels
- 1925 Lulu Ballard
- 1926 Isadore Channels
- 1927 Lulu Ballard
- 1928 Lulu Ballard
- 1929 Ora Washington
- 1930 Ora Washington
- 1931 Ora Washington
- 1932 Ora Washington
- 1933 Ora Washington
- 1934 Ora Washington
- 1935 Ora Washington
- 1936 Lulu Ballard
- 1937 Ora Washington
- 1938 Flora Lomax
- 1939 Flora Lomax
- 1940 Agnes Lawson
- 1941 Flora Lomax
- 1942 Flora Lomax
- 1943 Canceled due to World War II
- 1944 Roumania Peters
- 1945 Kathryn Irvis
- 1946 Roumania Peters
- 1947 Althea Gibson
- 1948 Althea Gibson
- 1949 Althea Gibson
- 1950 Althea Gibson
- 1951 Althea Gibson
- 1952 Althea Gibson
- 1953 Althea Gibson
- 1954 Althea Gibson
- 1955 Althea Gibson
- 1956 Althea Gibson
- 1957 Gwen McEvans
- 1958 Mary Etta Fine
- 1959 Gwen McEvans
- 1960 Mimi Kanarek
- 1961 Carolyn Williams
- 1962 Carolyn Liquori
- 1963 Ginger Pfiefer
- 1964 Bonnie Logan
- 1965 Bonnie Logan
- 1966 Bonnie Logan
- 1967 Bonnie Logan
- 1968 Bonnie Logan
- 1969 Bonnie Logan
- 1970 Bonnie Logan
- 1971 Bessie Stockard
- 1972 Lorraine Bryant
- 1973 Mimi Kanarek
- 1974 Jean Burnett
- 1975 Diane Morrison
- 1976 Kim Sands
- 1977 Leslie Allen
- 1978 Joann Jacobs
- 1979 Zina Garrison
- 1980 Zina Garrison
- 1981 Lori McNeil
- 1982 Lucy Becerra
- 1983 Lisa DeAngeles
- 1984 Shandra Livingston
- 1985 Kyle Copeland
- 1986 Melissa Brown
- 1987 Iwalani McCalla
- 1988 Iwalani McCalla
- 1989 Iwalani McCalla
- 1990 Erica Adams
- 1991 Iwalani McCalla
- 1992 Jeri Ingram
- 1993 Tonya Edwards
- 1994 Erica Adams
- 1995 Jeri Ingram
- 1996 Jeri Ingram
- 1997 Julie Steven
- 1998 Christina Turner
- 1999 Not held due to litigation.
- 2000 Luciane Kelbert
- 2001 Robyn White
- 2002 Stephanie Johnson
- 2003 Alana Van Dervort
- 2004 Tayo Bailey
- 2005 Tayo Bailey
- 2006 Cameron Benjamin
- 2007 Not available
- 2008 Rachel Rye
- 2009 Morocco "Roc" Hitt
- 2010 Jocelyn Providence
- 2011 Briana Berne
- 2012 Christine Clermont
- 2013 Angela McGahee
- 2014 Angela McGahee
- 2015 Angela McGahee
- 2016 Senaida Kambel
- 2017 Rasheeda A. McAdoo
- 2018 Isabelle Porter
- 2019 Isabelle Porter
- 2020: no tournament due to COVID-19 pandemic

== See also ==
- Tally Holmes, a founder
- United States Professional Tennis Association
- United States Tennis Association
