= Edward A. Everett (New York politician) =

American politician and lawyer

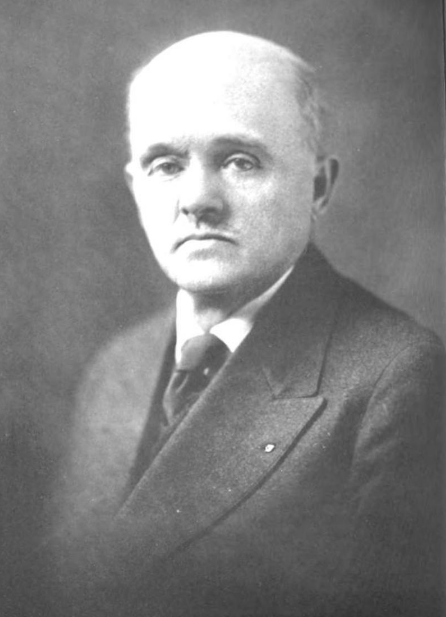
Edward A. Everett

Edward A. Everett (September 18, 1860 – December 22, 1928) was an American politician and lawyer. As a member of the New York State Assembly from the Second District of St. Lawrence County, he chaired the Everett Commission.

== Early life and law career ==
Everett was born on September 18, 1860, in Lawrence in St. Lawrence County, New York, to George W. Everett and Mary (Abraham) Everett. His father was a farmer, and Everett grew up on a farm, attending the Lawrenceville Academy and Potsdam Normal School. Everett moved to Parishville, New York, in 1873. He graduated from Albany Law School with a Bachelor of Laws in 1890. He had entered the New York State Bar Association in 1888.

That year he began practicing with the firm of Dart & Everett. William A. Dart died in 1891, and Everett practiced law solo until 1893. The following year Everett & Ginn was formed, with L. E. Ginn. This partnership continued until 1900. During this time Everett was also involved in several companies, including the High Falls Sulphite Pulp and Mining Company. After the turn of the century he spent six years as a solo lawyer, and continued his involvement in manufacturing pulp and paper in Pyrites, New York, with the Pyrites Paper Company, the De Grasse Paper Company and later (from 1906 to 1914) the H. D. Thatcher Company, a manufacturer of baking powder and dairy supplies.

== Political career ==
Everett was first elected to the New York State Assembly from the Second District of St. Lawrence as a Republican in 1914. He held his seat until 1922. Everett was a member of various committees and chaired those on Conservation and Judiciary. When a thirteen-person "Indian Commission" was founded in 1919 Everett, though he was not the first offered it, accepted the role of chair. He led the so-called Everett Commission in an investigation on Native American status. The report concluded that the Iroquois had a legal right to 6,000,000 acres (2,400,000 ha) of land in New York as a result of treaties signed in the late 18th century, specifically the 1784 Treaty of Fort Stanwix. Only Everett signed it, the assembly rejected the report, and it was not widely printed or distributed. The report has been credited with costing him re-election.

== Personal and later life ==
Everett was a member of the Freemasons and various subsidiary bodies and the Methodist Episcopal Church. He married Susan T. Weed in December 1900. The couple had at least four children.

Everett lost his seat in the 1922 election, in the primaries. He returned to law in Potsdam and was the supervisor of the town for a time. He died on December 22, 1928.

New York State Assembly
| Preceded by | New York State Assembly; St. Lawrence County, 2nd District; 1915–1922 | Succeeded by Walter L. Pratt |
