= Sani Lulu =

Nigerian football executive (born 1958)

Alhaji Sani Lulu Abdullahi (born 16 April 1958) is a former president of the Nigeria Football Federation (NFF). Prior to becoming the NFF President in 2006, he had served as FCT director of sports. His NFF presidency was however short-lived as he was impeached by the NFF Governing Board in 2010. He is the proprietor and chief executive officer of Fosla Football Academy based in Karshi in the Federal Capital Territory.

== Biography ==
Sani Lulu was born in Zaria, Kaduna State on 16 April 1958. He attended Federal Government College Warri, Delta State from 1971 to 1976. After completing his IJMB in the School of Basic Studies Zaria in 1977, he later obtained a bachelor's degree in Quantity Surveying from Ahmadu Bello University Zaria in 1980.
