= Ora Washington =

American athlete

- Country (sports): United States
- Born: January 23, 1898 Caroline County, Virginia, U.S.
- Died: December 21, 1971 (aged 71–73) Philadelphia, Pennsylvania, U.S.

Ora Belle Washington (January 23, 1898 – December 21, 1971) was an American athlete from the Germantown neighborhood of Philadelphia, Pennsylvania. Washington excelled in both tennis and basketball, and she was inducted into the Women's Basketball Hall of Fame in 2009 and the Naismith Memorial Basketball Hall of Fame in 2018. Black newspapers referred to her as "Queen Ora" and the "Queen of Two Courts." According to Arthur Ashe, she may have been one of best tennis players of all time and "the first Black female to dominate a sport".

== Early life ==
Washington was born in Virginia around 1899 to James Thomas Washington and Laura Young Washington. The exact date of her birth is unknown. After the American Civil War, the state of Virginia was in debt and to save money did not issue birth certificates from 1896 to 1912. The fifth of nine children, she grew up in the farming community of File located in Caroline County, Virginia. The Washingtons owned their farm, where they raised pigs and grew wheat, corn, and vegetables. While they fared better than sharecroppers in the area, the Washingtons struggled in the poor economy. In 1908, Laura Washington died in childbirth adding further strain to the family's finances. By 1910, the family farm had been mortgaged and James Washington had been unemployed for a number of months. Like other African Americans during the Great Migration, the Washingtons moved north in the mid 1910s looking for better economic opportunities.

Ora's aunt, Mattie Washington, was the first of the family to migrate, marry, and settle in Germantown. Once she was established, she invited Ora and her sisters to visit. Ora traveled to Germantown in the mid-1910s, and may have attended high school there. By 1920, census records indicate she was a live-in servant in town there.

== Career ==
=== Tennis ===
Shortly after her older sister, Georgia, died of tuberculosis, Washington found a home away from home at the YWCA that had opened in 1918 to serve black members of the Germantown neighborhood. Washington began playing tennis on the courts there in the early 1920s. In 1924, she went on to win the Wilmington, Delaware, city championships in singles, doubles, and mixed doubles. The following year, she defeated the reigning national Black American singles champion Isadore Channels. She won her first national title in 1925 with Lula Ballard at national doubles tournament of the all-Black American Tennis Association, which she would continue to win for the next eleven years. After moving to Chicago in 1929, Washington won her first singles championship that same year when she defeated Frances Gittens in three sets. Despite losing the first set to Gittens 4-6, she came back in the second set 6-4, and defeated Gittens in the third set 6-2. With this win, she had secured her first singles title. She would win the title seven more times by 1937.

On the tennis court, Washington's presence loomed larger to her opponents than her 5 ft 7 in (170 cm), 130-pound (59 kg) frame. Biographers have noted that she favored an unconventional tennis playing style. A right-hander, she held the racket in the middle of the grip, "choking up" like a baseball player on a bat. She also preferred brief warmup sessions before matches, saying, "I'd rather play from scratch and warm up as I went along." Opponents and fans described Washington as a strategic and physically strong player, noting her intimidating competitiveness and overhead play. Tennis great Arthur Ashe credited her foot speed, honed during her basketball play, as one of her greatest strengths on the court.

In the spring of 1938, Washington announced that she planned to retire from singles tennis play. Because she was still dominating the competition, and actively playing doubles and mixed doubles, some questioned her decision. In an interview in the Baltimore Afro-American in the summer of 1939, she explained, "It does not pay to be national champion too long. It's the struggle to be one that counts. Once arrived everybody wants to take it away from you and you are the object of many criticisms." Washington remained focused and professional about her work on the courts and relatively quiet and "plain" off the courts. Her blue-collar, rural style may have contributed to her lower visibility among the black elite tennis community.

Following Washington's singles retirement, Flora Lomax of Detroit, Michigan, won the singles title in 1938. In contrast to Washington, Lomax quickly earned a reputation as "the glamour girl of tennis", for her strong fashion sense and friendship with icons such as Joe Louis. With Lomax's 1938 victory, the press generated a rivalry between the two players, with some claiming that Washington had retired so she wouldn't have to face Lomax. Those speculations were enough to draw Washington out of retirement. The next summer, she signed up for a tournament in Buffalo, New York, where she disposed of Lomax in three sets, 6-2, 1-6, 6-2. Washington did not mince words when interviewed about her brief return: "Certain people said certain things last year. They said Ora was not so good any more. I had not planned to enter singles this year, but I just had to go up to Buffalo to prove somebody was wrong."

Washington desired to expand her talents beyond African American tennis, wanting to compete in United States Lawn Tennis Association tournaments. Washington wanted to take on strong white players such as Helen Wills Moody, but was unable to due to segregation that was firmly enforced in the 1930s during Washington’s career. The color line would not be broken until 1948 by Althea Gibson. Washington retired completely from sport in the mid-1940s, after she and partner George Stewart defeated Walter Johnson and upcoming superstar Althea Gibson to win the 1947 ATA mixed doubles title. Johnson was later quoted as saying, "Ora would have beaten Althea if she hadn't retired." Washington was almost 30 years older than Gibson, then aged 19.

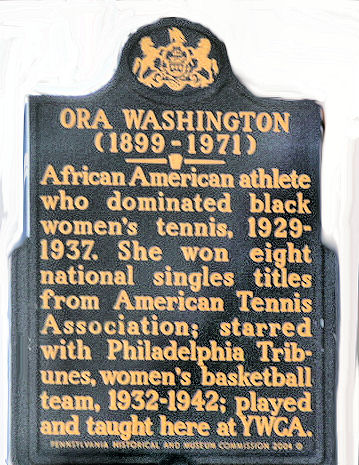
Historical marker about Ora Washington in Philadelphia

=== Basketball ===
She played basketball first in 1930 with the Germantown Hornets, and their 22–1 record earned her the national female title. The Hornets were originally sponsored by the same Germantown YWCA that introduced Washington to tennis. As the team gained popularity, they separated from the YWCA and became fully professional. The following year, Washington led the Hornets to 33 consecutive victories. On April 9, 1931, the Hornets won the National Girls Basketball Title, beating the Rankin Femmes, a team from near Pittsburgh, in the final. Their opponents included African American women's teams, white women's teams and, occasionally, African American men's teams. In one game against the male Quicksteppers in January 1932, they stayed close and, on a last second basket by Evelyn Mann, the Hornets emerged victorious. Contemporaneous reports describe Washington's outrageous long shots and record scores.

The Philadelphia Tribune, the oldest Black newspaper in the country, saw an opportunity to argue for civil rights by demonstrating Black sporting excellence and decided to sponsor a basketball team. The Philadelphia Tribunes were coached by a prominent local activist called Joe Rainey - whose grandfather, also Joseph Rainey, was the first Black person to serve in the United States House of Representatives. Washington played with the Philadelphia Tribune Girls from 1932–1942, she was the team's center, leading scorer, and coach. Washington played for the Tribunes in a three-game event against Bennett College in 1934. The Tribunes won all three games, the second of which was described by the Chicago Defender as "the greatest exhibition ever staged in North Carolina". The Tribune Girls won 11 straight Women's Colored Basketball World's Championships. Washington was said to be "the best Colored player in the world."

In 1932, Otto Briggs brought Ora Washington over to the Philadelphia Tribune Girls which helped the tribunes assert themselves in Black women's basketball. Washington was a dominant figure in this organisation, and her impact led to intra-Black debates in regards to the role of women's competitive sport. Despite many praising Washington as the "Queen of the Courts," others were uneasy about her playing style, which they found to be too rough and undermined the ideals of femininity which was being promoted at the time. During the Tribunes' 1934 series in Greensboro at Bennet College, a 'ladylike' style of play was being supported before the event. Despite this the Tribunes and Washington escaped with the victory. Washington had mixed reviews about her as an athlete and a player, with some praising her as a dignified champion, and others critiquing her aggression. This is a representation of how class, gender and race shaped peoples views on athletes during this time, which was especially prevalent for Ora Washington.

== Later life ==
While playing for the Tribunes, Washington received a small salary. But she never was paid enough from sport to give up her day job as a housekeeper. During the 1940-41 season, Washington announced her retirement from competitive tennis singles due to an injury received during a basketball game. “What more can I get from playing tennis anyhow?” Washington asked a reporter from the Baltimore Afro-American. Washington never married. Over the years, she lived with family members and female friends. After a long illness, Washington died in 1971. She was buried in her Virginia hometown.

== Honors and tributes ==
In 1976, Washington was posthumously inducted into the Black Athletes Hall of Fame.

In the mid-1980s, she was inducted to Temple University's Sports Hall of Fame.

A state historical marker stands at 6128 Germantown Avenue, Philadelphia, the location of the Colored YWCA where she taught and played, now home to Settlement Music School.

In 2009, Washington was elected to the Women's Basketball Hall of Fame, located in Knoxville, Tennessee.

On March 31, 2018, it was announced she was being inducted as part of the Basketball Hall of Fame class of 2018.

On July 31, 2019, a statue inspired by Washington, titled "MVP", was added to Smith Playground in Philadelphia's Fairmount Park.

Washington had accumulated 155 trophies during her career and was the only player to win national titles in the singles, doubles, and mixed doubles in the same year.

== See also ==
- Basketball in the United States
- Germantown, Philadelphia
- Women's tennis in the United States
