= Lulu Statia =

Curaçaoan footballer (born 1997)

Personal information
- Full name: Luivienna Statia
- Date of birth: 25 April 1997 (age 29)
- Place of birth: Dordrecht, Netherlands
- Height: 1.78 m (5 ft 10 in)
- Position: Left-back

Team information
- Current team: Rijsoord

Youth career
- RKSV RCD
- EBOH
- SC Feyenoord
- 2008–2016: FC Dordrecht

Senior career*
| Years | Team | Apps | (Gls) |
| 2016–2018 | FC Dordrecht | 15 | (0) |
| 2019 | Excelsior Maassluis | 4 | (0) |
| 2019–2021 | Barendrecht | 14 | (0) |
| 2021–2023 | Excelsior Maassluis | 47 | (1) |
| 2023– | Rijsoord | | |
- * Club domestic league appearances and goals as of 19:45, 26 July 2023 (UTC)

Luivienna "Lulu" Statia (born 25 April 1997) is a Curaçaoan footballer who plays as a left-back for Tweede Klasse club Rijsoord. He also holds Dutch citizenship.

== Club career ==
He made his professional debut in the Eerste Divisie for FC Dordrecht on 25 November 2016 in a game against FC Eindhoven.
