= Bayrd Still =

American historian

Bayrd Still (July 7, 1906 – November 19, 1992) was an American historian who taught at New York University (NYU). He also directed the NYU Archives and was a founding member of the New York City Landmarks Preservation Commission from 1962 to 1965.
