= Ken Saxon =

New Zealand cricketer (1894–1976)

Ken Saxon MC
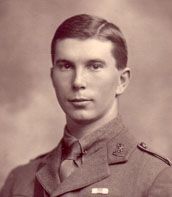

Personal information
- Full name: Kendall Reginald James von Tunzelmann Saxon
- Born: 1 September 1894; Nelson, New Zealand
- Died: 1 June 1976 (aged 81); Pinner, Middlesex, England
- Batting: Right-handed
- Role: Wicket-keeper
- Relatives: Doug Coombs (nephew)

Domestic team information
- Years: Team
- 1923/24–1924/25: Nelson
- 1923/24: Canterbury
- 1927–1934: Cambridgeshire

Career statistics
Competition	First-class
Matches	1
Runs scored	43
Batting average	21.50
100s/50s	0/0
Top score	43
Catches/stumpings	0/–
- Source: Cricinfo, 21 July 2019

Kendall Reginald James von Tunzelmann Saxon MC (1 November 1894 – 1 June 1976) was a New Zealand soldier, first-class cricketer and educator.

== Life and career ==
Saxon was born in Nelson, New Zealand, one of seven children of James and Clara Saxon. He was educated at Nelson College and returned to teach there in 1913.

Saxon served in the First World War as an officer in the New Zealand Rifle Brigade. While serving as a lieutenant in the 4th Battalion in 1916 he was awarded the Military Cross for "conspicuous gallantry in action". In 1918, as a captain in the 1st Battalion, he was awarded a bar to his MC for "conspicuous gallantry and devotion to duty". Each time he had shown courage and leadership under fire, the first time while wounded. His older brother Jack was killed at the Somme in 1916.

In October 1919 he began studying science at Emmanuel College, Cambridge. He represented Cambridge in the rugby match against Oxford in 1920, but a war wound to his knee prevented his taking part in 1921. He won the long jump at the Cambridge University sports in 1921 with a jump of 21 feet 9 inches, beating the future Olympian Harold Abrahams by one inch. He graduated in June 1922, married Frances Smyth of Monks Kirby, Warwickshire, in Farnham Royal, Buckinghamshire, on 29 June, and sailed for New Zealand on 20 July to take up a position at Nelson College.

Saxon captained Nelson when they won the Hawke Cup from Wanganui in January 1924, opening the batting and making the two highest scores of the match, 59 and 42 not out. A month later he was selected in the Canterbury team to play a first-class match against the touring New South Wales, again opening the batting, and making 43 and 0.

Returning to England in the mid-1920s, Saxon took up a teaching position in Cambridgeshire. At the end of 1928 he began teaching at Merchant Taylors' School, Northwood.

Saxon played regularly for the Cambridgeshire team in Minor Counties cricket from 1927 to 1934. His highest score in Minor Counties cricket was 160, opening the batting against Surrey Second XI in 1933.

Saxon married for a second time in May 1931 to Elizabeth Francis of Cambridge. They lived in London.
