= Lulu Ballard =

American tennis player (1908–1981)

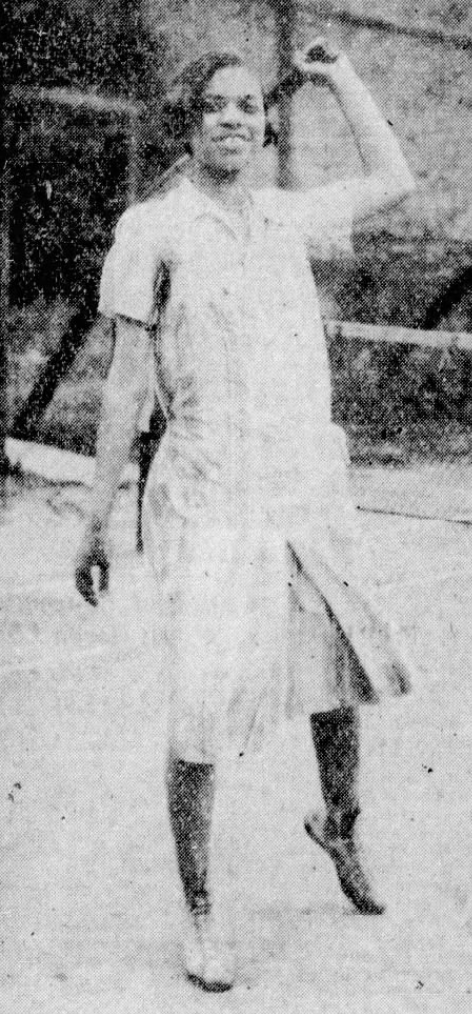
- Ballard, from a 1927 publication
- Born: July 3, 1908; South Carolina, U.S.
- Died: March 15, 1981 (aged 72); Houston, Texas, U.S.
- Other names: Lula Ballard, Lula Belcher
- Occupations: Tennis player, sports coach

Lula Lee Ballard Belcher (July 3, 1908 – March 15, 1981), known as Lulu Ballard, was an American tennis player and physical educator. She competed from 1922 into the 1940s, and won four American Tennis Association titles in women's singles. She was inducted into the Black Tennis Hall of Fame in 2011.

== Early life and education ==
Ballard was born in South Carolina and raised in Philadelphia, the daughter of John A. Ballard and Elizabeth Logan Ballard. Her sister Alberta Ballard was also a competitive tennis player. She attended high school in Germantown and graduated from Tuskegee Institute in 1936.

== Career ==
Ballard was a top-ranked tennis player in the 1920s and 1930s. "Miss Ballard's victory is without a doubt the biggest achievement of a Quaker City tennis player in recent years," remarked The Philadelphia Tribune in 1924, when she defeated Isadore Channels in straight sets. She won four national women's singles titles from the American Tennis Association, in 1925, 1927, 1928, and 1936.

Ora Washington and Ballard often faced each other in final rounds; she defeated Washington at the 1936 championships in Ohio, a grueling summer match "with the thermometer standing at 102". Ballard and Washington teamed up for women's doubles play, and won nine American Tennis Association doubles championships. She also competed in mixed doubles, with partner Gerald Norman Jr. She continued competing in tennis events, as late as 1946.

Ballard coached tennis at the Germantown YWCA. She also played basketball, badminton, field hockey, and golf, and was a strong swimmer. Around 1940, she moved to Cleveland, Ohio, where she taught physical education in public schools, and was athletic director of the Phillis Wheatley Association. She was one of the founders of the Cleveland Women's Physical Education Association. In 1975, she was inducted into the Athletic Hall of Fame at Tuskegee Institute.

== Personal life and legacy ==
Ballard was left-handed. She married Paul Belcher in 1959; they divorced in 1976. She died in 1981, in Houston, Texas, at the age of 72. She was inducted into the Black Tennis Hall of Fame in 2011.
