= Lulu Wang (engineer) =

New Zealand biomedical engineer

Lulu Wang is a New Zealand biomedical engineer whose research applies deep learning to microwave imaging, particularly as applied in the detection and diagnosis of breast cancer and lung cancer. Educated in New Zealand, she has worked in New Zealand, China, the United States, South Africa, and Iceland, where she is a professor of engineering at Reykjavík University.

== Education and career ==
Wang has a bachelor's degree with honours from the Manukau Institute of Technology in Auckland, New Zealand. She continued her studies at the University of Auckland, where she received a master's degree with first class honours in 2009 and completed her Ph.D. in 2013. Her doctoral dissertation, Holographic Microwave Imaging for Lesion Detection, was jointly supervised by Ahmed M. Al-Jumaily and Ray Simpkin.

From 2013 to 2015, she continued to work at the University of Auckland as a postdoctoral research fellow in the Institute of Biomedical Technologies. She joined the Hefei University of Technology in China in 2015, as an associate professor of biomedical engineering, and in 2020 she moved to Shenzhen Technology University as a distinguished professor of biomedical engineering.

She joined Reykjavík University in 2025 as a professor of engineering, and is also a visiting professor at the Mayo Clinic in the United States, and a professor extraordinarius at the University of South Africa.

== Recognition ==
Wang was named as an ASME Fellow in 2022.
