= Lulu Benstead =

Australian opera singer (1891–1983)

- Born: Lucelle Stuart Benstead; Stuart, Australia
- Died: 1983 (aged 92); London, United Kingdom
- Other names: Lucille
- Occupation: Singer
- Years active: 1910-c. 1950

Lulu Benstead (1891–1983; born Lucelle Stuart Benstead) was an Australian opera singer and performer.

She claimed to be the first European child born in Alice Springs, although this was actually her older sister Queenie who had died in infancy.

== Early life ==
Benstead was born in 1891. At that time, her parents Triphenia and William Benstead leased the Stuart Arms Hotel in Stuart (now Alice Springs), where they publicly presented her on 5 February 1891. Later that year, and after tiring of the Stuart Arms Hotel and the prospects of the Arltunga Goldfields, the family moved to Coolgardie, where the musically-talented family entertained people on the mining fields, among other activities. In Coolgardie, Lulu trained with the woman married to Jack Wilson and helped the town be recognised as the "musical centre of the goldfields".

In 1907, the 'Coolgardie Lulu Benstead Continental Musical Education Fund Committee' was set up to raise money for her musical education, and her family moved to England in 1910 to help her further her career. Using the money raised, she traveled to Berlin and Paris.

== Career ==
Once living in Europe Benstead sang extensively in Paris, Vienna, Milan, America and Canada, and often topped the bill at the London Palladium, under the newly adopted professional name "Lucille".

Some of her most popular songs, that she introduced and were written for her, are: "The Bells of St. Mary's", "God send you back to me", "My Curly Headed Baby", "The Long, Long Trail", "The Perfect Day" and "Chloe". According to Jose Petrick, Benstead's personal favourite song was "Stay In Your Own Backyard".

She also sang to troops in both World Wars throughout Germany, France, Holland and the Middle East, during which she often experienced great personal discomfort.

== Later life ==
She gave singing lessons in London for her last 30 years, almost until her death at age 92.
