= Lulu King Saxon =

American painter (1852–1927)

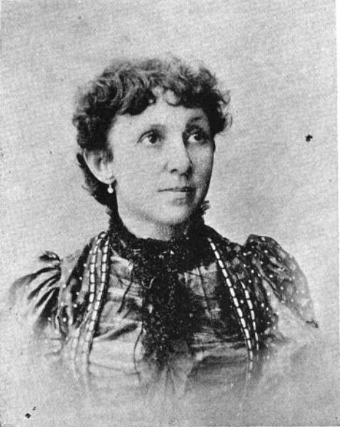
- Born: Lulu King; 1852; Louisiana
- Died: February 21, 1927 (aged 74–75); New Orleans, Louisiana
- Known for: Painter

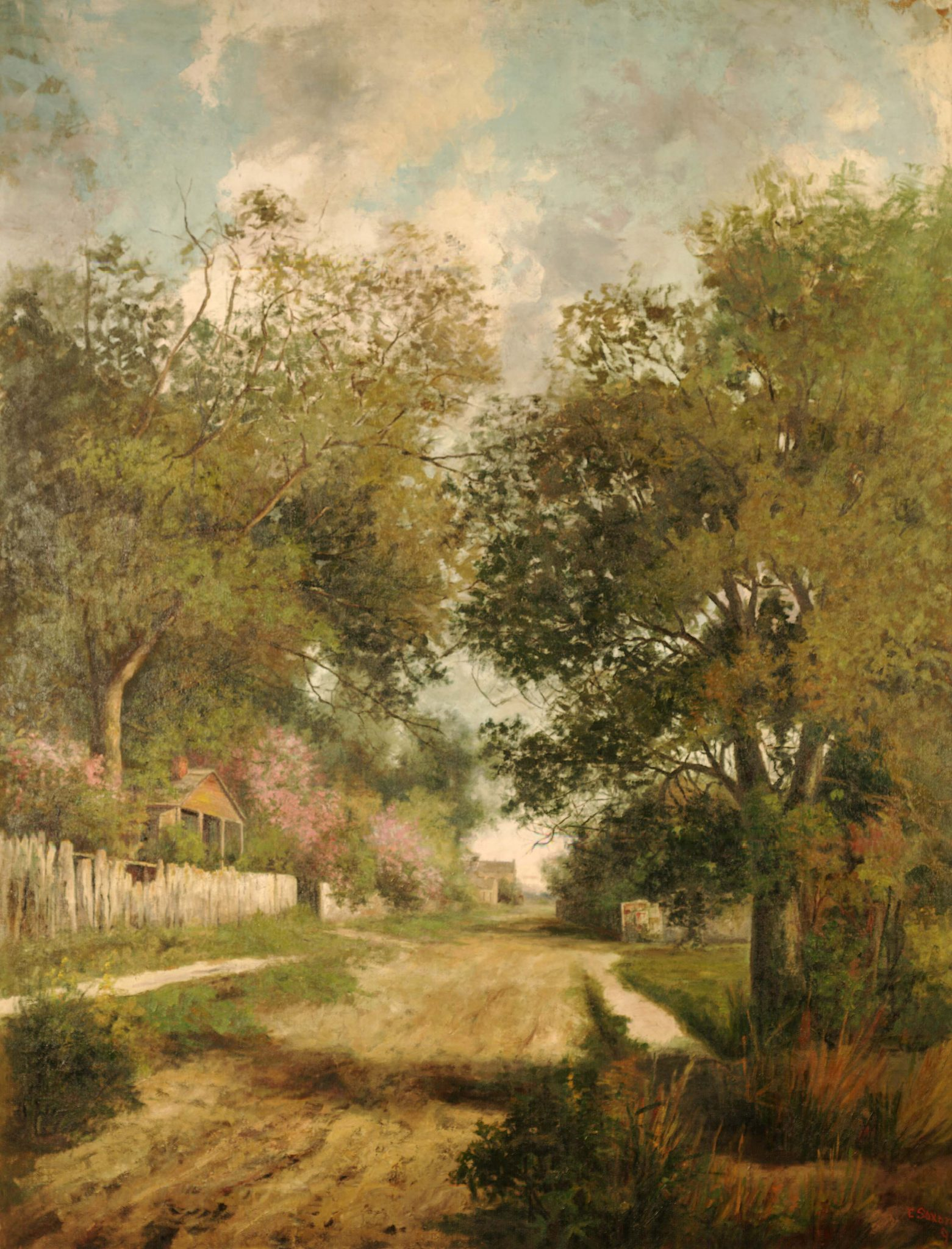
Lulu King Saxon - Uptown Street, New Orleans, 1890

Lulu King Saxon (1852–1927) was an American landscape painter.

Saxon née King was born in 1852 in Louisiana. She studied with Andres Molinary and Bror Anders Wikström. Saxon was a member of the Artists' Association of New Orleans, exhibiting with the association several times from 1887 through 1902.

She also exhibited at the 1884 World's Fair. She was married to Walter Lyle Saxon and died on February 21, 1927, in New Orleans.

Her work is in the collection of the Ogden Museum of Southern Art.
