= Lula (disambiguation) =

Luiz Inácio Lula da Silva (born 1945) is a Brazilian politician who served as the President of Brazil from 2003 to 2011 and again since 2023.

Lula or LULA or lula may also refer to:

== Geography ==
- Lula, Sardinia, a small town in the province of Nuoro, Italy
- Lula, Levice District, a village in Slovakia
- Lula, Georgia, a small city in the U.S.
- Lula, Mississippi, a small town in the U.S.

== People ==
=== Single name ===
- Lula (footballer, born 1922) (1922–1972), Brazilian football coach
- Lula (footballer, born 1946), Brazilian footballer
- Lula (footballer, born 1966), Brazilian footballer

=== Given name ===
- Lula Ali Ismaïl (born 1978), Djibouti-Canadian film director and screenwriter
- Lula Barbosa (born 1970), Brazilian beach volleyball player
- Lula Carvalho (born 1977), Brazilian cinematographer
- Lula Côrtes (1949–2011), Brazilian musician
- Lula Ferreira (born 1951), Brazilian basketball coach
- Lula Galvão (born 1962), Brazilian guitarist
- Lula Hymes Glenn (1917–2016), American track and field athlete
- Lula Mae Hardaway (1930–2006), American songwriter, Grammy Award nominee, mother of Stevie Wonder
- Lula Lubchenco (1915–2001), American pediatrician
- Lula Mysz-Gmeiner (1876–1948), German concert contralto and mezzo-soprano
- Lula Pace (1868–1925), American professor of biology and geology at Baylor University
- Lula Pena (born 1974), Portuguese fado singer, composer and poet
- Lula Reed (1926–2008), American rhythm and blues and gospel singer
- Lula Greene Richards (1849–1944), American poet
- Lula Vollmer (1889–1955), American writer, dramatist, playwright
- Lula Warlick (1884–1957), American nurse

== Other uses ==
- LuLa, Hiro Todo's name for the FEMM band
- Lula (avocado), an avocado cultivar from Florida
- Lula (Dave the Barbarian), a character in Dave the Barbarian
- Lula (magazine), a British culture and fashion biannual
- Lula (series), a series of Windows games
- LuLa (web site) or Luminous Landscape, a photography site
- Lula, Son of Brazil, a 2010 film
  - Lula, o filho do Brasil (soundtrack)
- Lusoga Language Authority (LULA)

== See also ==
- "My Lula Gal", a folk song
- Lul (disambiguation)
- Lule (disambiguation)
- Luli (disambiguation)
- Lulu (disambiguation)
