= Mary Harper =

Mary Harper may refer to:

- Mary C. Harper (1929–2012), American educator and politician
- Mary Starke Harper (1919–2006), African American nurse
- Mere Harper (1842–1924), also known as Mary, porter, cultural informant, and midwife of Kāi Tahu and Kāti Huirapa descent
