= Lule =

Lule may refer to:

== Culture and language ==
- Lule people, an indigenous people of northern Argentina
- Lule language, a possibly extinct language of Argentina
- Lule Sámi, a language spoken in Sweden and Norway

== Places ==
- Luleå, or Lule, a town in Sweden
- Lule River, in Sweden

== People ==
- Joseph Konde-Lule, Ugandan medical sociologist and epidemiologist
- Godfrey Serunkuma Lule (born 1932), Ugandan lawyer
- Yusuf Lule (1912–1985), president of Uganda in 1979
- Lule Warrenton (1862–1932), American actress, director, and producer

== See also ==
- Lul (disambiguation)
- Luleh, a village in Iran
- Lula (disambiguation)
- Luli (disambiguation)
- Lulo
- Lulu (disambiguation)
