= History of the Americas =

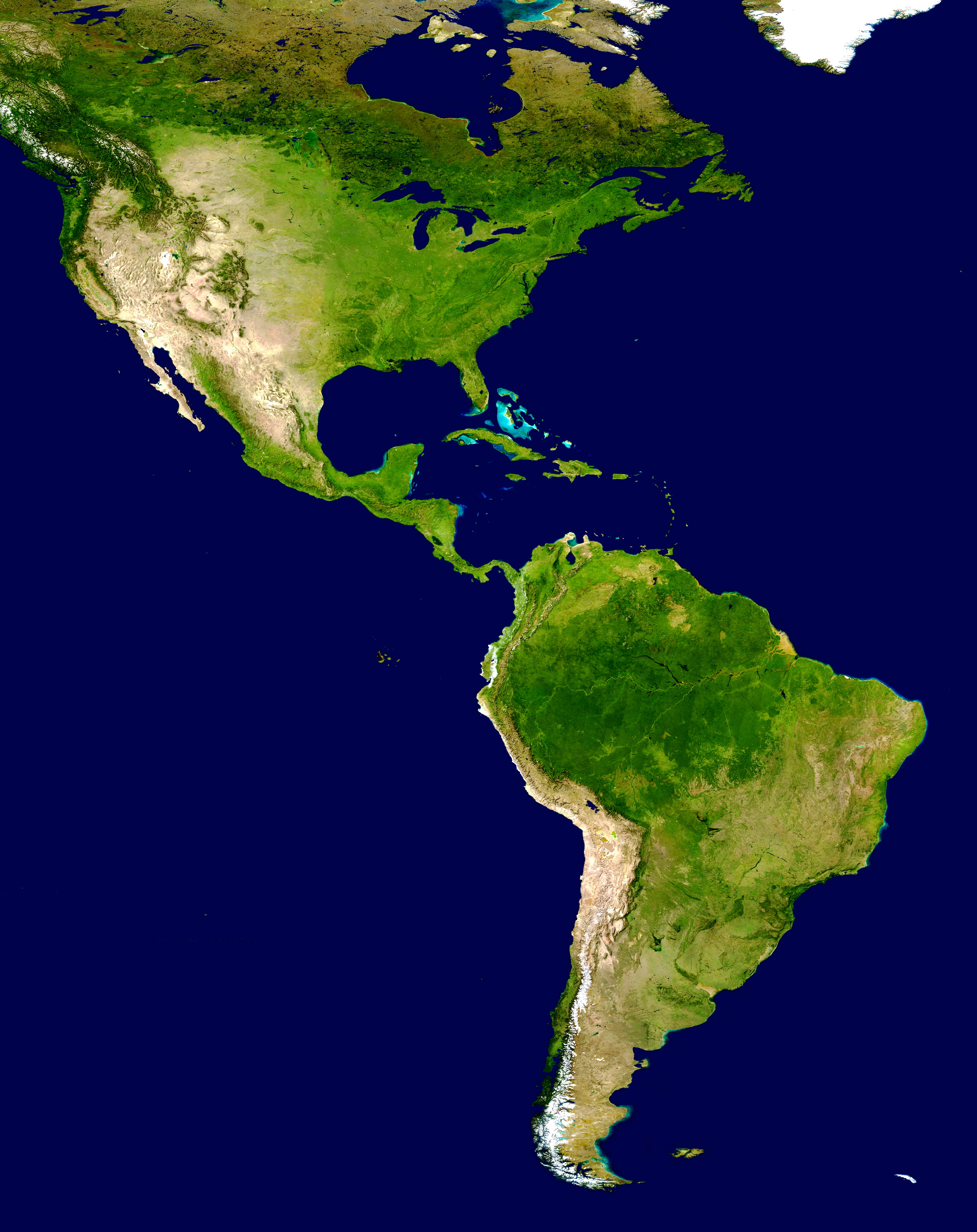
A true-color image of the Americas. Much of the information in the image comes from a single remote-sensing device—NASA's Moderate Resolution Imaging Spectroradiometer, or MODIS, flying over 700 km above the Earth on board the Terra satellite in 2001.

The human history of the Americas is thought to begin with people migrating to these areas from Asia during the height of an ice age. These groups are generally believed to have been isolated from the people of the "Old World" until the coming of Europeans in 1492 with the voyages of Christopher Columbus.

The ancestors of today's American Indigenous peoples were the Paleo-Indians; they were hunter-gatherers who migrated into North America. The most popular theory asserts that migrants came to the Americas via Beringia, the land mass now covered by the ocean waters of the Bering Strait. Small lithic stage peoples followed megafauna like bison, mammoth (now extinct), and caribou, thus gaining the modern nickname "big-game hunters." Groups of people may also have traveled into North America on shelf or sheet ice along the northern Pacific coast.

Sedentary societies developed primarily in two regions: Mesoamerica and the Andean civilizations. Mesoamerican cultures include Zapotec, Toltec, Olmec, Maya, Aztec, Mixtec, Totonac, Teotihuacan, Huastec people, Purépecha, Izapa, and Mazatec. Andean cultures include Inca, Caral-Supe, Wari, Tiwanaku, Chimor, Moche, Muisca, Chavin, Paracas, and Nazca.

After the voyages of Christopher Columbus in 1492, Spanish and later Portuguese, English, French and Dutch colonial expeditions arrived in the New World, conquering and settling the discovered lands, which led to a transformation of the cultural and physical landscape in the Americas. Spain colonized most of the Americas from present-day Southwestern United States, Florida and the Caribbean to the southern tip of South America. Portugal settled in what is mostly present-day Brazil while England established colonies on the Eastern coast of the United States, as well as the North Pacific coast and in most of Canada. France settled in Quebec and other parts of Eastern Canada and claimed an area in what is today the central United States. The Netherlands settled New Netherland (administrative centre New Amsterdam – now New York), some Caribbean islands and parts of Northern South America.

European colonization of the Americas led to the rise of new cultures, civilizations and eventually states, which resulted from the fusion of Native American, European, and African traditions, peoples and institutions. The transformation of American cultures through colonization is evident in architecture, religion, gastronomy, the arts and particularly languages, the most widespread being Spanish (376 million speakers), English (348 million) and Portuguese (201 million). The colonial period lasted approximately three centuries, from the early 16th to the early 19th centuries, when Brazil and the larger Hispanic American nations declared independence. The United States obtained independence from Great Britain much earlier, in 1776, while Canada formed a federal dominion in 1867 and received legal independence in 1931. Others remained attached to their European parent state until the end of the 19th century, such as Cuba and Puerto Rico which were linked to Spain until 1899. Smaller territories such as Guyana obtained independence in the mid-20th century, while French Guiana, the Falkland Islands, Bermuda and several Caribbean islands remain part of a European power to this day.

== Pre-colonization ==
=== Migration into the continents ===
Map of early human migrations based on the Out of Africa theory; figures are in thousands of years ago (kya).

It is believed that the peopling of the Americas began when Paleolithic hunter-gatherers (Paleo-Indians) entered North America from the North Asian Mammoth steppe via the Beringia land bridge, which had formed between northeastern Siberia and western Alaska due to the lowering of sea level during the Last Glacial Maximum (26,000 to 19,000 years ago). These populations expanded south of the Laurentide Ice Sheet, either by sea or land, and spread rapidly southward, occupying both North and South America no later than 14,000 years ago, and possibly before 20,000 years ago. The earliest populations in the Americas, before roughly 10,000 years ago, are known as Paleo-Indians. Indigenous peoples of the Americas have been linked to Siberian populations by the distribution of blood types, and in genetic composition as reflected by molecular data, such as DNA.

While there is general agreement that the Americas were first settled from Asia, the migration patterns and the place(s) of origin in Eurasia of the peoples who migrated to the Americas remain unclear. The most generally accepted theory is that Ancient Beringians moved when sea levels were significantly lowered due to the Quaternary glaciation, following herds of now-extinct Pleistocene megafauna along ice-free corridors that stretched between the Laurentide and Cordilleran ice sheets. Another proposed route has them migrating down the Pacific coast to South America as far as Chile, either on foot or using boats. Any archaeological evidence of coastal occupation during the last Ice Age would now have been covered by the sea level rise, up to a hundred meters since then.

The precise date for the peopling of the Americas is a long-standing open question. While advances in archaeology, Pleistocene geology, physical anthropology, and DNA analysis have progressively shed more light on the subject, significant questions remain unresolved. The Clovis First theory refers to the hypothesis that the Clovis culture represents the earliest human presence in the Americas about 13,000 years ago. Evidence of pre-Clovis cultures has accumulated and pushed back the possible date of the first peopling of the Americas. Academics generally believe that humans reached North America south of the Laurentide Ice Sheet at some point between 15,000 and 20,000 years ago. Current debates center around four glacial-age openings which could have allowed entry into North America: coastal around 24,000 and 15,000 years ago, inland around 14,000 years ago, and coastal around 12,000 years ago. The Swan Point Archaeological Site located in Alaska has yielded the oldest evidence of human habitation that is not disputed, with artifacts that have radiocarbon dates of 14,000 years, indicating the site was occupied around 12,000 BCE.

=== Lithic stage (before 8000 BCE) ===
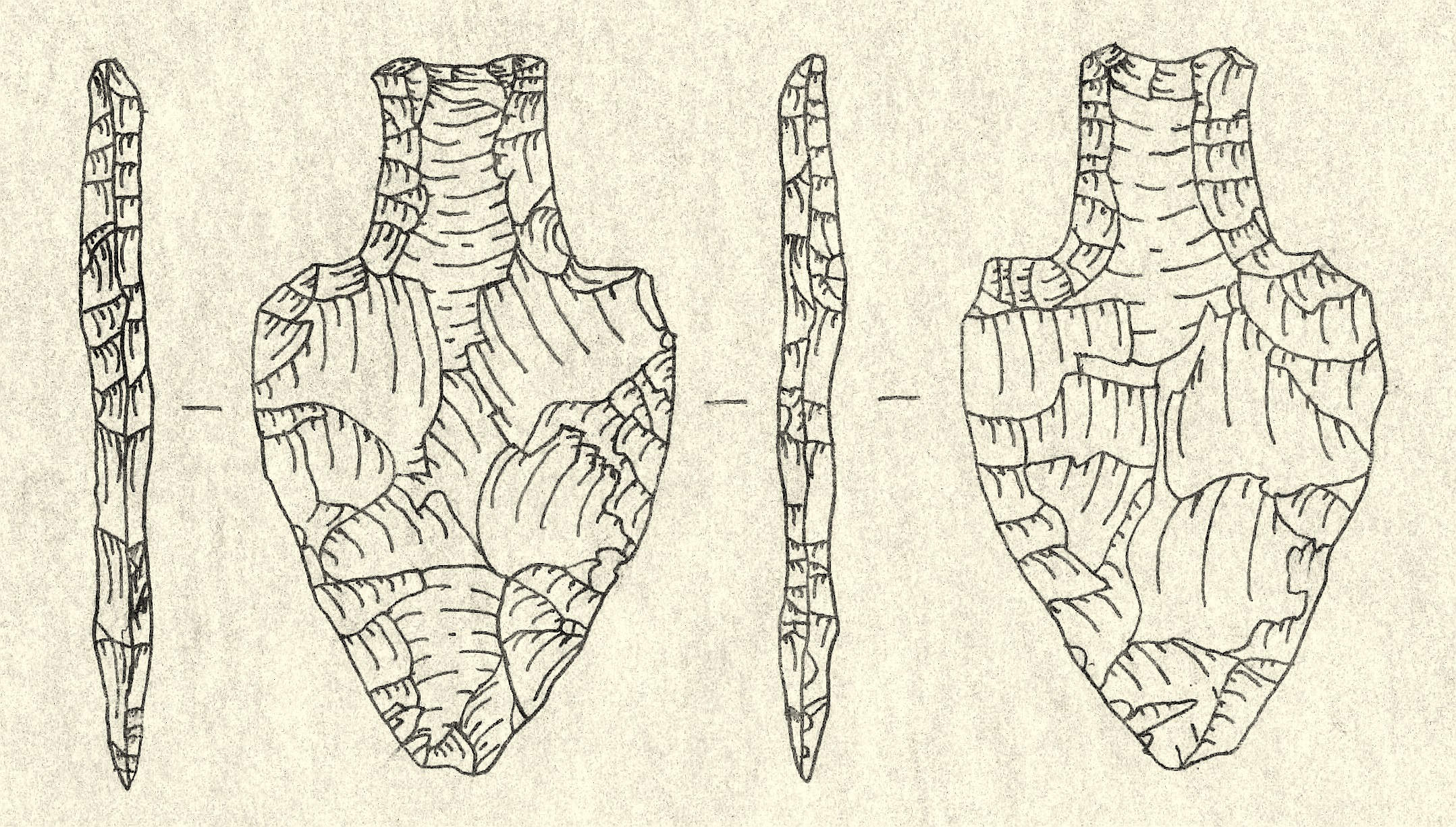
Stemmed fluted "Fishtail" point found in Belize

The Lithic stage or Paleo-Indian period, is the earliest classification term referring to the first stage of human habitation in the Americas, covering the Late Pleistocene epoch. The time period derives its name from the appearance of "Lithic flaked" stone tools. Stone tools, particularly projectile points and scrapers, are the primary evidence of the earliest well known human activity in the Americas. Lithic reduction stone tools are used by archaeologists and anthropologists to classify cultural periods.

=== Archaic stage (8000–1000 BCE) ===
Several thousand years after the first migrations, the first complex civilizations arose as hunter-gatherers settled into semi-agricultural communities. Identifiable sedentary settlements began to emerge in the so-called Middle Archaic period around 6000 BCE. Particular archaeological cultures can be identified and easily classified throughout the Archaic period.

In the late Archaic, on the north-central coastal region of Peru, a complex civilization arose which has been termed the Norte Chico civilization, also known as Caral-Supe. It is the oldest known civilization in the Americas and one of the six sites where civilization originated independently and indigenously in the ancient world, flourishing between the 30th and 18th centuries BC. It pre-dated the Mesoamerican Olmec civilization by nearly two millennia. It was contemporaneous with the ancient civilisation in Egypt following the unification of its kingdom under Narmer and the emergence of the first Egyptian hieroglyphics.

Monumental architecture, including earthwork platform mounds and sunken plazas, have been identified as part of the civilization. Archaeological evidence points to the use of textile technology and the worship of common god symbols. Government, possibly in the form of theocracy, is assumed to have been required to manage the region. However, numerous questions remain about its organization. In archaeological nomenclature, the culture was pre-ceramic culture of the pre-Columbian Late Archaic period. It appears to have lacked ceramics and art.

Ongoing scholarly debate persists over the extent to which the flourishing of Norte Chico resulted from its abundant maritime food resources, and the relationship that these resources would suggest between coastal and inland sites. The role of seafood in the Norte Chico diet has been a subject of scholarly debate. In 1973, examining the Aspero region of Norte Chico, Michael E. Moseley contended that a maritime subsistence (seafood) economy had been the basis of society and its early flourishing. This theory, later termed "maritime foundation of Andean Civilization" was at odds with the general scholarly consensus that civilization arose as a result of intensive grain-based agriculture, as had been the case in the emergence of civilizations in northeast Africa (Egypt) and southwest Asia (Mesopotamia).

While earlier research pointed to edible domestic plants such as squash, beans, lúcuma, guava, pacay, and camote at Caral, publications by Haas and colleagues have added avocado, achira, and maize (Zea Mays) to the list of foods consumed in the region. In 2013, Haas and colleagues reported that maize was a primary component of the diet throughout the period of 3000 to 1800 BC. Cotton was another widespread crop in Norte Chico, essential to the production of fishing nets and textiles. Jonathan Haas noted a mutual dependency, whereby "The prehistoric residents of the Norte Chico needed the fish resources for their protein and the fishermen needed the cotton to make the nets to catch the fish."

In the 2005 book 1491: New Revelations of the Americas Before Columbus, journalist Charles C. Mann surveyed the literature at the time, reporting a date "sometime before 3200 BC, and possibly before 3500 BC" as the beginning date for the formation of Norte Chico. He notes that the earliest date securely associated with a city is 3500 BC, at Huaricanga in the (inland) Fortaleza area. The Norte Chico civilization began to decline around 1800 BC as more powerful centers appeared to the south and north along its coast, and to the east within the Andes Mountains.

=== Mesoamerica, the Woodland Period, and Mississippian culture (2000 BCE – 500 CE) ===
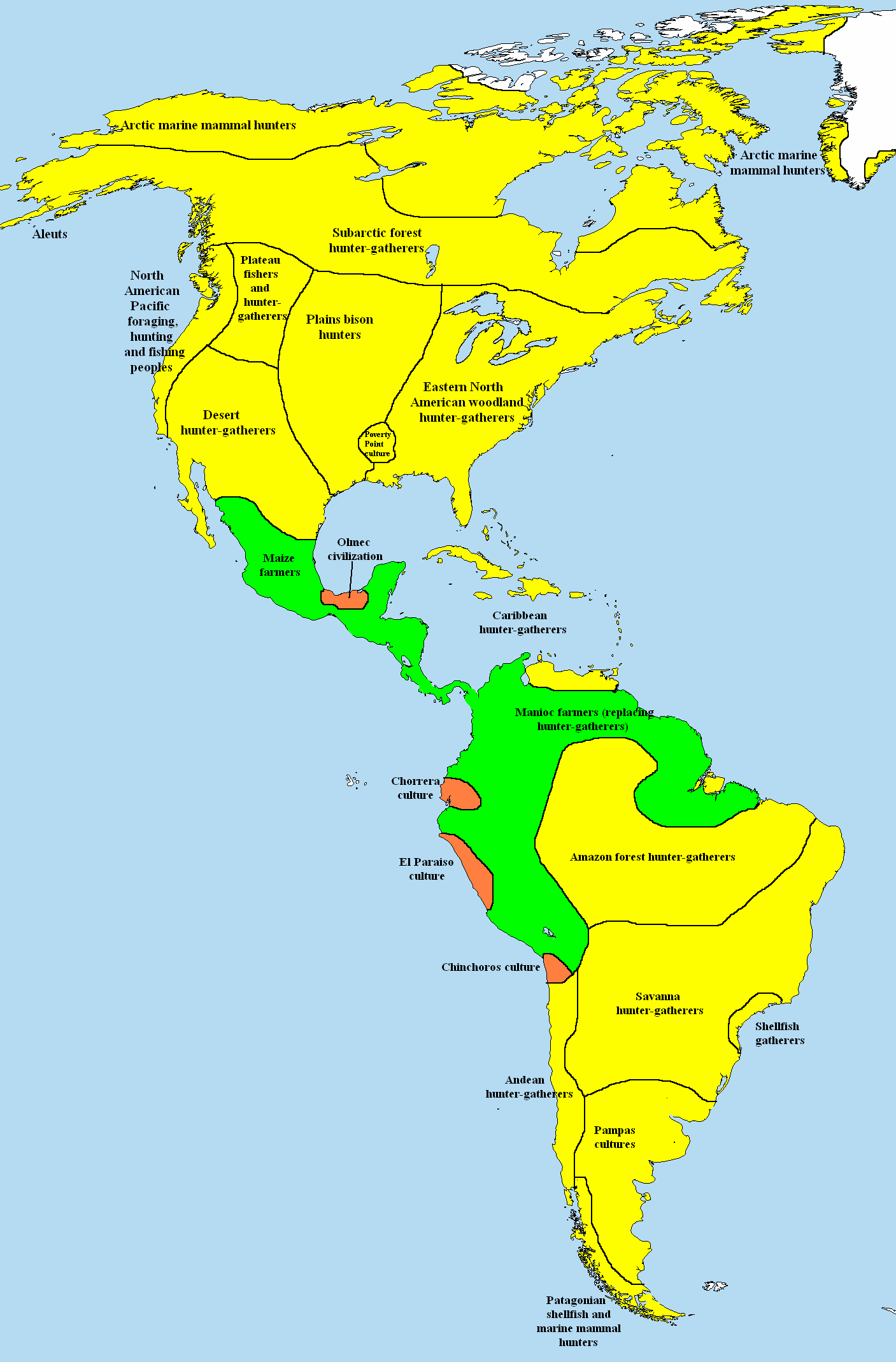
Simple map of subsistence methods in the Americas at 1000 BCE: hunter-gatherers simple farming societies complex farming societies (tribal chiefdoms or civilizations)

After the decline of the Norte Chico civilization, numerous complex civilizations and centralized polities developed in the Western Hemisphere: The Chavin, Nazca, Moche, Huari, Quitus, Cañaris, Chimu, Pachacamac, Tiahuanaco, Aymara and Inca in the Andes; the Muisca, Tairona, Miskito, Huetar, and Talamanca in the Intermediate Area; the Taínos in the Caribbean; and the Olmecs, Maya, Toltecs, Mixtecs, Zapotecs, Aztecs, Purepecha and Nicoya in Mesoamerica.

The Olmec civilization was the first Mesoamerican civilization, beginning around 1600–1400 BC and ending around 400 BC. Mesoamerica is considered one of the six sites around the globe in which civilization developed independently and indigenously. This civilization is considered the mother culture of the Mesoamerican civilizations. The Mesoamerican calendar, numeral system, writing, and much of the Mesoamerican pantheon seem to have begun with the Olmec.

Some elements of agriculture seem to have been practiced in Mesoamerica quite early. The domestication of maize is thought to have begun around 7,500 to 12,000 years ago. The earliest record of lowland maize cultivation dates to around 5100 BC. Agriculture continued to be mixed with a hunting-gathering-fishing lifestyle until quite late compared to other regions, but by 2700 BC, Mesoamericans were relying on maize, and living mostly in villages. Temple mounds and classes started to appear. By 1300/1200 BC, small centres coalesced into the Olmec civilization, which seems to have been a set of city-states, united in religious and commercial concerns. The Olmec cities had ceremonial complexes with earth/clay pyramids, palaces, stone monuments, aqueducts and walled plazas. The first of these centers was at San Lorenzo (until 900 BC). La Venta was the last great Olmec centre. Olmec artisans sculpted jade and clay figurines of Jaguars and humans. Their iconic giant heads – believed to be of Olmec rulers – stood in every major city.

The Olmec civilization ended in 400 BC, with the defacing and destruction of San Lorenzo and La Venta, two of the major cities. It nevertheless spawned many other states, most notably the Mayan civilization, whose first cities began appearing around 700–600 BC. Olmec influences continued to appear in many later Mesoamerican civilizations.

Cities of the Aztecs, Mayas, and Incas were as large and organized as the largest in the Old World, with an estimated population of 200,000 to 350,000 in Tenochtitlan, the capital of the Aztec Empire. The market established in the city was said to have been the largest ever seen by the conquistadors when they arrived. The capital of the Cahokians, Cahokia, located near modern East St. Louis, Illinois, may have reached a population of over 20,000. At its peak, between the 12th and 13th centuries, Cahokia may have been the most populous city in North America. Monk's Mound, the major ceremonial center of Cahokia, remains the largest earthen construction of the prehistoric New World.

These civilizations developed agriculture as well, breeding maize (corn) from having ears 2–5 cm in length to perhaps 10–15 cm in length. Potatoes, tomatoes, beans (greens), pumpkins, avocados, and chocolate are now the most popular of the pre-Columbian agricultural products. The civilizations did not develop extensive livestock as there were few suitable species, although alpacas and llamas were domesticated for use as beasts of burden and sources of wool and meat in the Andes. By the 15th century, maize was being farmed in the Mississippi River Valley after introduction from Mexico. The course of further agricultural development was greatly altered by the arrival of Europeans.

=== Classic stage (800 BCE – 1533 CE) ===
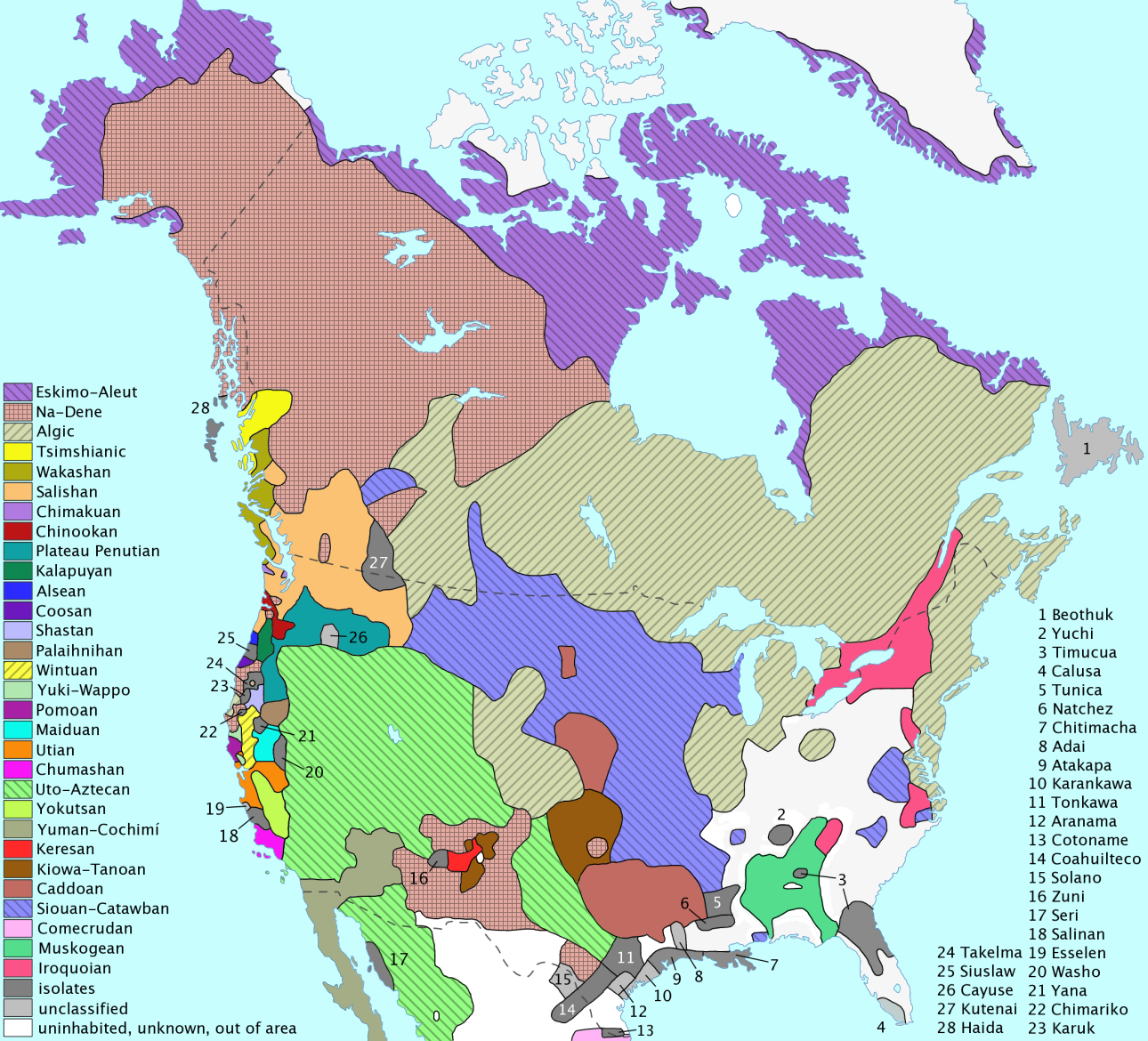
Pre-contact: distribution of North American language families, including northern Mexico

==== Cahokia ====
Cahokia was a major regional chiefdom, with trade and tributary chiefdoms located in a range of areas from bordering the Great Lakes to the Gulf of Mexico.

===== Haudenosaune =====
The Iroquois League of Nations or "People of the Long House", based in present-day upstate and western New York, had a confederacy model from the mid-15th century. It has been suggested that their culture contributed to political thinking during the development of the later United States government. Their system of affiliation was a kind of federation, different from the strong, centralized European monarchies.

Leadership was restricted to a group of 50 sachem chiefs, each representing one clan within a tribe; the Oneida and Mohawk people had nine seats each; the Onondagas held fourteen; the Cayuga had ten seats; and the Seneca had eight. Representation was not based on population numbers, as the Seneca tribe greatly outnumbered the others. When a sachem chief died, his successor was chosen by the senior woman of his tribe in consultation with other female members of the clan; property and hereditary leadership were passed matrilineally. Decisions were not made through voting but through consensus decision making, with each sachem chief holding theoretical veto power. The Onondaga were the "firekeepers", responsible for raising topics to be discussed. They occupied one side of a three-sided fire (the Mohawk and Seneca sat on one side of the fire, the Oneida and Cayuga sat on the third side.)

Long-distance trading did not prevent warfare and displacement among the indigenous peoples, and their oral histories tell of numerous migrations to the historic territories where Europeans encountered them. The Iroquois invaded and attacked tribes in the Ohio River area of present-day Kentucky and claimed the hunting grounds. Historians have placed these events as occurring as early as the 13th century, or in the 17th century Beaver Wars.

Through warfare, the Iroquois drove several tribes to migrate west to what became known as their historically traditional lands west of the Mississippi River. Tribes originating in the Ohio Valley who moved west included the Osage, Kaw, Ponca and Omaha people. By the mid-17th century, they had resettled in their historical lands in present-day Kansas, Nebraska, Arkansas and Oklahoma. The Osage warred with Caddo-speaking Native Americans, displacing them in turn by the mid-18th century and dominating their new historical territories.

==== Oasisamerica ====
===== Pueblo people =====
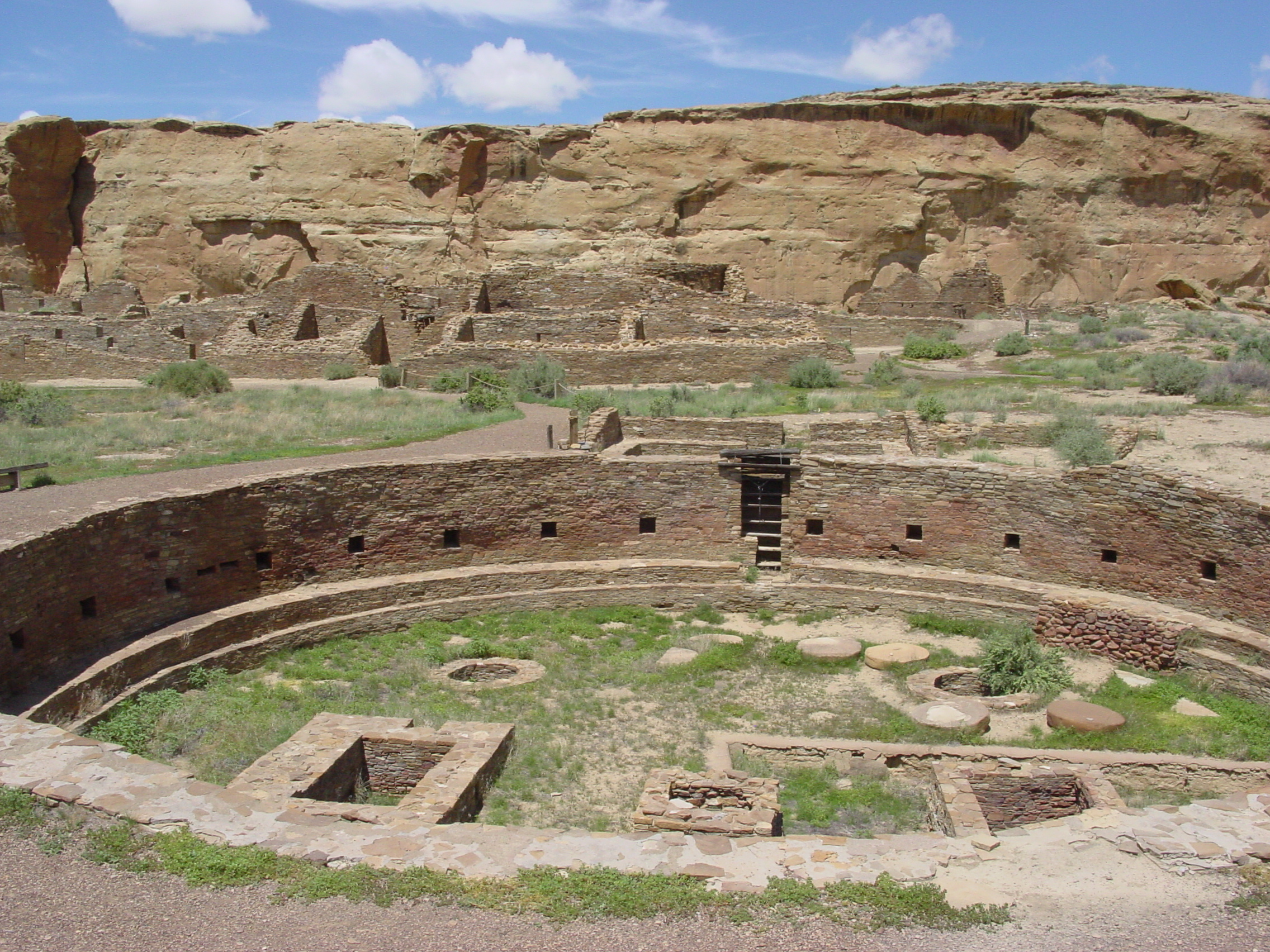
The Great Kiva of Chetro Ketl at the Chaco Culture National Historical Park, World Heritage Site

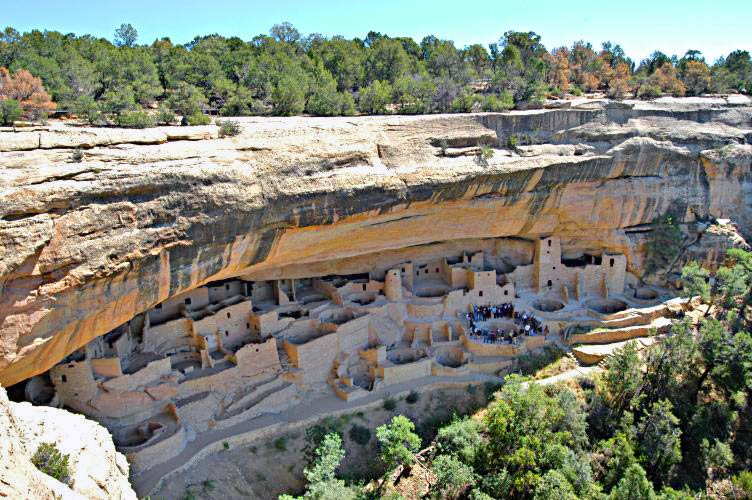
Cliff Palace, Mesa Verde National Park, a World Heritage Site

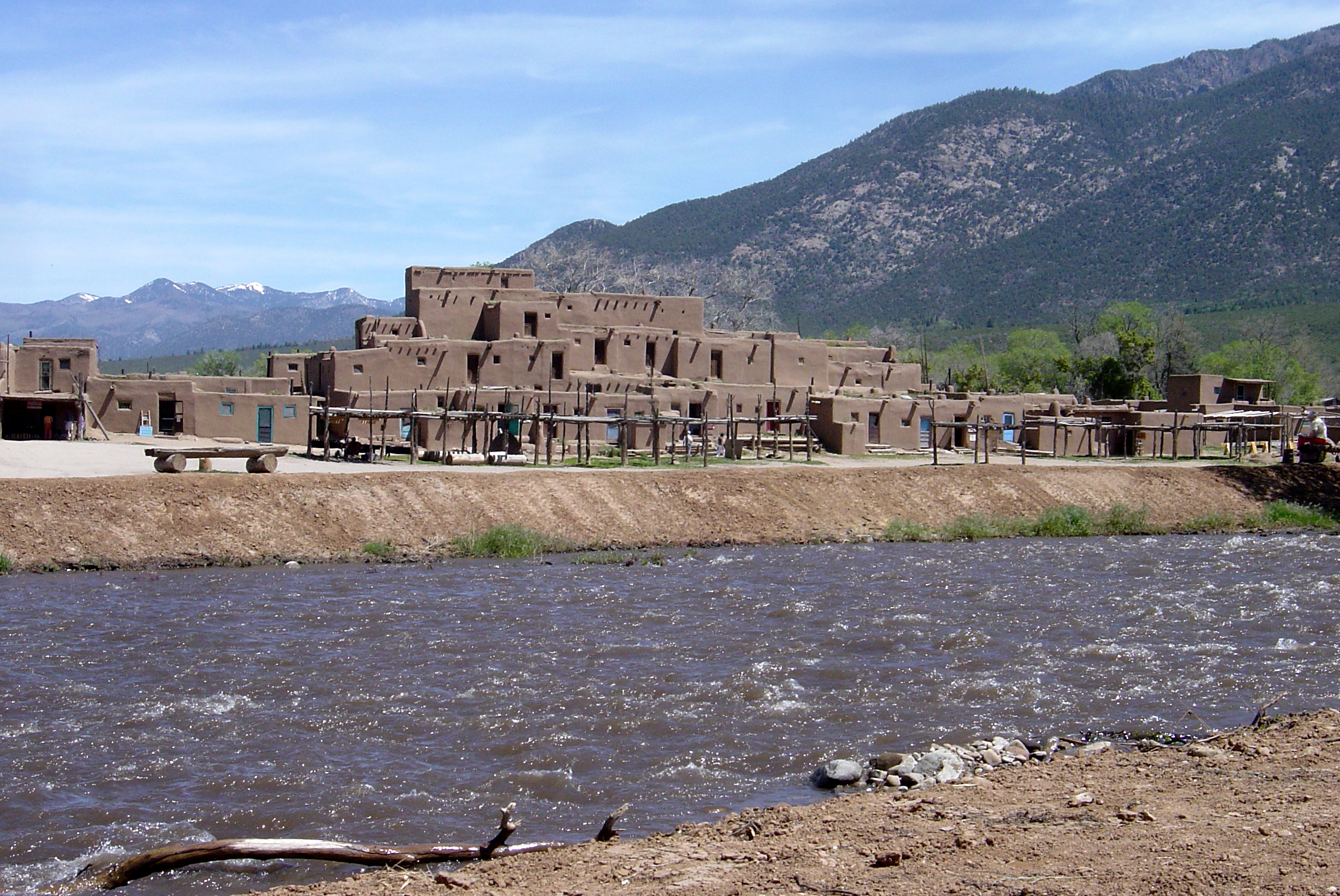
Taos Pueblo, a World Heritage Site, belonging to a Native American tribe of Pueblo people, marking cultural development during the Pre-Columbian era

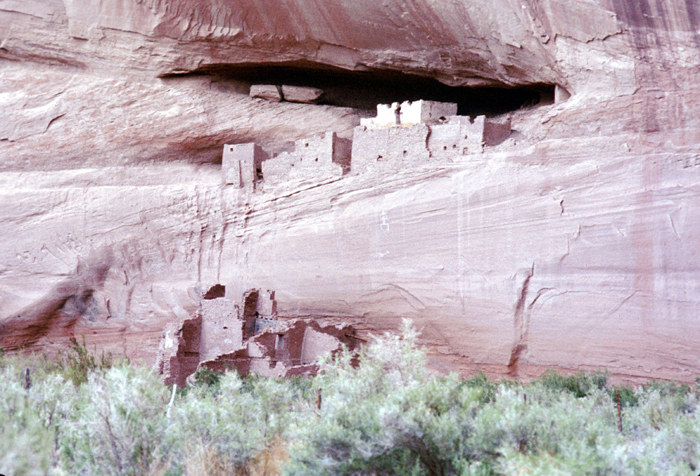
White House Ruins, Canyon de Chelly National Monument

For the Pueblo people of what is now occupied by the Southwestern United States and northern Mexico, living conditions were that of large stone apartment like adobe structures. They inhabited Arizona, New Mexico, Utah, Colorado, and possibly surrounding areas.

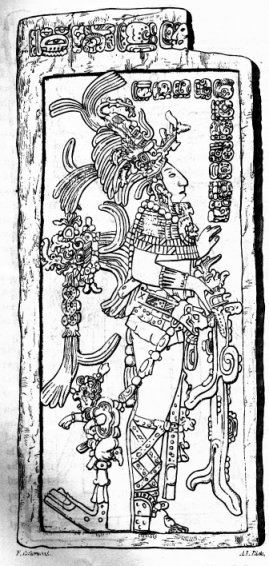
K'inich Kan B'alam II, the Classic period ruler of Palenque, as depicted on a stela

==== Aridoamerica ====
===== Chichimeca =====
Chichimeca was the name that the Mexica (Aztecs) generically applied to a wide range of semi-nomadic peoples who inhabited the north of modern-day Mexico, and carried the same sense as the European term "barbarian". The name was adopted with a pejorative tone by the Spaniards when referring especially to the semi-nomadic hunter-gatherer peoples of northern Mexico.

==== Mesoamerica ====
===== Olmec =====
The Olmec civilization emerged around 1200 BCE in Mesoamerica and ended around 400 BCE. Olmec art and concepts influenced surrounding cultures after their downfall. This civilization was thought to be the first in America to develop a writing system. After the Olmecs abandoned their cities for unknown reasons, the Maya, Zapotec and Teotihuacan arose.

===== Purepecha =====
The Purepecha civilization emerged around 1000 CE in Mesoamerica. They flourished from 1100 CE to 1530 CE. They continue to live on in the state of Michoacán. Fierce warriors, they were never conquered and in their glory years, successfully sealed off huge areas from Aztec domination.

===== Maya =====
Maya history spans 3,000 years. The Classic Maya may have collapsed due to changing climate in the end of the 10th century.

===== Toltec =====
The Toltec were a nomadic people, dating from the 10th–12th century, whose language was also spoken by the Aztecs.

===== Teotihuacan =====
Teotihuacan (4th century BCE – 7/8th century CE) was both a city, and an empire of the same name, which, at its zenith between 150 and the 5th century, covered most of Mesoamerica.

===== Aztec =====
The Aztec having started to build their empire around 14th century found their civilization abruptly ended by the Spanish conquistadors. They lived in Mesoamerica, and surrounding lands. Their capital city Tenochtitlan was one of the largest cities of all time.

==== South America ====
Inca Quipu. Larco Museum Collection.

===== Valdivia culture =====
The Valdivia culture is one of the oldest settled cultures recorded in the Americas. It emerged from the earlier Las Vegas culture and thrived along the coast of Santa Elena peninsula in Santa Elena Province of Ecuador between 3500 BCE and 1500 BCE.

===== Norte Chico =====
One of the oldest known civilization of the Americas was established in the Norte Chico region of modern Peru. Complex society emerged in the group of coastal valleys, between 3000 and 1800 BCE. The Quipu, a distinctive recording device among Andean civilizations, apparently dates from the era of Norte Chico's prominence.

===== Chavín =====
The Chavín established a trade network and developed agriculture by as early as (or late compared to the Old World) 900 BCE according to some estimates and archaeological finds. Artifacts were found at a site called Chavín in modern Peru at an elevation of 3,177 meters. Chavín civilization spanned from 900 BCE to 300 BCE.

==== Upano Valley ====
The Upano Valley sites in present-day eastern Ecuador predate all known complex Amazonian societies, spanning from approximately 500 BCE to 300–600 CE.

===== Inca =====
Holding their capital at the great city of Cusco, the Inca civilization dominated the Andes region from 1438 to 1533. Known as Tawantinsuyu, or "the land of the four regions", in Quechua, the Inca culture was highly distinct and developed. Cities were built with precise, unmatched stonework, constructed over many levels of mountain terrain. Terrace farming was a useful form of agriculture. There is evidence of excellent metalwork and even successful trepanation of the skull in Inca civilization.

== European colonization ==
Amerigo Vespucci awakens "America" in a Stradanus's engraving (c. 1638).

Non-Native American nations' claims over North America, 1750–1999

Political evolution of Central America and the Caribbean since 1700

European nations' control over South America, 1700 to present

Around 1000, the Vikings established a short-lived settlement in Newfoundland, now known as L'Anse aux Meadows. Speculations exist about other Old World discoveries of the New World, but none of these are generally or completely accepted by most scholars.

Spain sponsored a major exploration led by Italian explorer Christopher Columbus in 1492; it quickly led to extensive European colonization of the Americas. The Europeans brought Old World diseases which are thought to have caused catastrophic epidemics and a huge decrease of the native population. Columbus came at a time in which many technical developments in sailing techniques and communication made it possible to report his voyages easily and to spread word of them throughout Europe. It was also a time of growing religious, imperial and economic rivalries that led to a competition for the establishment of colonies.

=== Colonial period ===
15th to 19th century colonies in the New World:

- Spanish colonization of the Americas (1492)
- Viceroyalty of New Spain (1535–1821)
- Viceroyalty of Peru (1542–1824)
- Spanish Main
- Spanish West Indies
- Captaincy General of Guatemala
- British America / Thirteen Colonies (1584/1607 – 1776/20th century)
- French Saint-Domingue (1659–1804)
- Danish West Indies
- New Netherland
- New France
- Captaincy General of Venezuela
- Portuguese colonization of the Americas (1499–1822)
- Colonial Brazil (1500–1815)

=== Decolonization ===
The formation of sovereign states in the New World began with the United States Declaration of Independence of 1776. The American Revolutionary War lasted through the period of the Siege of Yorktown—its last major campaign—in the early autumn of 1781, with peace being achieved in 1783. In 1804, after the French of Napoleon Bonaparte were defeated during the Haitian Revolution under the black leadership of Jean-Jacques Dessalines declare the colony of Saint-Domingue independence of the Haitian Declaration of Independence as he renamed the country Ayiti meaning (Land of Mountains), Haiti became the world's first black-led republic in the New World, the first Caribbean state as well as the first Latin American country and the second oldest independent nation in the Western Hemisphere after the United States to win independence from Britain in 1783.

The Spanish colonies won their independence in the first quarter of the 19th century, in the Spanish American wars of independence. Simón Bolívar and José de San Martín, among others, led their independence struggle. Although Bolivar attempted to keep the Spanish-speaking parts of Latin America politically allied, they rapidly became independent of one another as well, and several further wars were fought, such as the Paraguayan War and the War of the Pacific. (See Latin American integration.) In the Portuguese colony Dom Pedro I (also Pedro IV of Portugal), son of the Portuguese king Dom João VI, proclaimed the country's independence in 1822 and became Brazil's first Emperor. This was peacefully accepted by the crown in Portugal, upon compensation.

=== Effects of slavery ===
Slavery has had a significant role in the economic development of the New World after the colonization of the Americas by the Europeans. The cotton, tobacco, and sugarcane harvested by slaves became important exports for the United States and the Caribbean countries.

== 20th century ==
=== North America ===
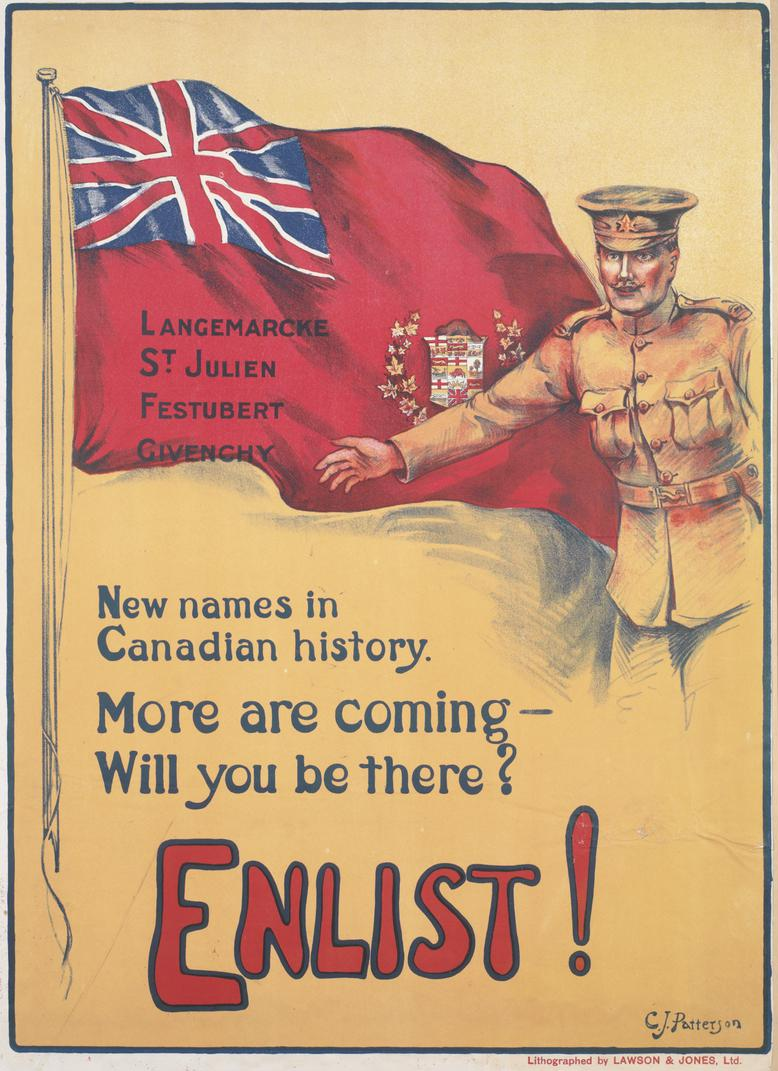
A Canadian World War I recruiting poster (1914–1918)

As a part of the British Empire, Canada immediately entered World War I when it broke out in 1914. Canada bore the brunt of several major battles during the early stages of the war, including the use of poison gas attacks at Ypres. Losses became grave, and the government eventually brought in conscription, despite the fact this was against the wishes of the majority of French Canadians. In the ensuing Conscription Crisis of 1917, riots broke out on the streets of Montreal. In neighboring Newfoundland, the new dominion suffered a devastating loss on 1 July 1916, the First day on the Somme.

The United States stayed out of the conflict until 1917, when it joined the Entente powers. The United States was then able to play a crucial role at the Paris Peace Conference of 1919 that shaped interwar Europe. Mexico was not part of the war, as the country was embroiled in the Mexican Revolution at the time.

The 1920s brought an age of great prosperity in the United States, and to a lesser degree Canada. But the Wall Street crash of 1929 combined with drought ushered in a period of economic hardship in the United States and Canada. From 1926 to 1929, there was a popular uprising against the anti-Catholic Mexican government of the time, set off specifically by the anti-clerical provisions of the Mexican Constitution of 1917.

Once again, Canada found itself at war before its neighbors, with numerically modest but significant contributions overseas such as the Battle of Hong Kong and the Battle of Britain. The entry of the United States into the war helped to tip the balance in favour of the allies. Two Mexican tankers, transporting oil to the United States, were attacked and sunk by the Germans in the Gulf of Mexico waters, in 1942. The incident happened in spite of Mexico's neutrality at that time. This led Mexico to enter the conflict with a declaration of war on the Axis nations. The destruction of Europe wrought by the war vaulted all North American countries to more important roles in world affairs, especially the United States, which emerged as a "superpower".

The early Cold War era saw the United States as the most powerful nation in a Western coalition of which Mexico and Canada were also a part. In Canada, Quebec was transformed by the Quiet Revolution and the emergence of Quebec nationalism. Mexico experienced an era of huge economic growth after World War II, a heavy industrialization process and a growth of its middle class, a period known in Mexican history as "El Milagro Mexicano" (the Mexican miracle). The Caribbean saw the beginnings of decolonization, while on the largest island the Cuban Revolution introduced Cold War rivalries into Latin America.

The civil rights movement in the U.S. ended Jim Crow and empowered black voters in the 1960s, which allowed black citizens to move into high government offices for the first time since Reconstruction. However, the dominant New Deal coalition collapsed in the mid-1960s in disputes over race and the Vietnam War, and the conservative movement began its rise to power, as the once dominant liberalism weakened and collapsed. Canada during this era was dominated by the leadership of Pierre Elliot Trudeau. In 1982, at the end of his tenure, Canada enshrined a new constitution.

Canada's Brian Mulroney not only ran on a similar platform but also favored closer trade ties with the United States. This led to the Canada-United States Free Trade Agreement in January 1989. Mexican presidents Miguel de la Madrid, in the early 1980s and Carlos Salinas de Gortari in the late 1980s, started implementing liberal economic strategies that were seen as a good move. However, Mexico experienced a strong economic recession in 1982 and the Mexican peso suffered a devaluation. In the United States president Ronald Reagan attempted to move the United States back towards a hard anti-communist line in foreign affairs, in what his supporters saw as an attempt to assert moral leadership (compared to the Soviet Union) in the world community. Domestically, Reagan attempted to bring in a package of privatization and regulation to stimulate the economy.

The end of the Cold War and the beginning of the era of sustained economic expansion coincided during the 1990s. On 1 January 1994, Canada, Mexico and the United States signed the North American Free Trade Agreement, creating the world's largest free trade area. In 2000, Vicente Fox became the first non-PRI candidate to win the Mexican presidency in over 70 years. The optimism of the 1990s was shattered by the 9/11 attacks of 2001 on the United States, which prompted military intervention in Afghanistan, which also involved Canada. Canada did not support the United States' later move to invade Iraq, however.

In the U.S. the Reagan Era of conservative national policies, deregulation and tax cuts took control with the election of Ronald Reagan in 1980. By 2010, political scientists were debating whether the election of Barack Obama in 2008 represented an end of the Reagan Era, or was only a reaction against the bubble economy of the 2000s (decade), which burst in 2008 and became the Late-2000s recession with prolonged unemployment.

Country or Territory with flag	Area (km^{2}) (sq mi)	Population (2021 est.)	Population density per km^{2} (per sq mi)	Capital
Bermuda (United Kingdom)	54 km^{2} (21 sq mi)	64,185	1,189/km² (3,079/sq mi)	Hamilton
Canada	9,984,670 km^{2} (3,855,100 sq mi)	39,858,480	3.99/km² (10.33/sq mi)	Ottawa
Clipperton Island (France)	8.9 km^{2} (3.4 sq mi)	Uninhabited	0/km² (0/sq mi)	N/A
Greenland (Denmark)	2,166,086 km^{2} (836,330 sq mi)	56,583	0.026/km² (0.067/sq mi)	Nuuk
Mexico	1,972,550 km^{2} (761,610 sq mi)	129,875,529	65.8/km² (170.4/sq mi)	Mexico City
Saint Pierre and Miquelon (France)	242 km^{2} (93 sq mi)	6,008	24.8/km² (64.2/sq mi)	Saint-Pierre
United States	9,833,520 km^{2} (3,796,740 sq mi)	336,997,624	88.8/km² (230/sq mi)	Washington, D.C.
Total	17,920,353 km^{2} (6,919,087 sq mi)	506,807,509	28.3/km^{2} (73.2/sq mi)	

=== Central America ===
Despite the failure of a lasting political union, the concept of Central American reunification, though lacking enthusiasm from the leaders of the individual countries, rises from time to time. In 1856–1857 the region successfully established a military coalition to repel an invasion by United States adventurer William Walker. Today, all five nations fly flags that retain the old federal motif of two outer blue bands bounding an inner white stripe. (Costa Rica, traditionally the least committed of the five to regional integration, modified its flag significantly in 1848 by darkening the blue and adding a double-wide inner red band, in honor of the French tricolor).

In 1907, a Central American Court of Justice was created. On 13 December 1960, Guatemala, El Salvador, Honduras, and Nicaragua established the Central American Common Market ("CACM"). Costa Rica, because of its relative economic prosperity and political stability, chose not to participate in the CACM. The goals for the CACM were to create greater political unification and success of import substitution industrialization policies. The project was an immediate economic success, but was abandoned after the 1969 "Football War" between El Salvador and Honduras. A Central American Parliament has operated, as a purely advisory body, since 1991. Costa Rica has repeatedly declined invitations to join the regional parliament, which seats deputies from the four other former members of the Union, as well as from Panama and the Dominican Republic.

Country or Territory with flag	Area (km^{2}) (sq mi)	Population (2021 est.)	Population density per km^{2} (per sq mi)	Capital
Belize	22,970 km^{2} (8,870 sq mi)	441,471	19.22/km² (49.78/sq mi)	Belmopan
Costa Rica	51,180 km^{2} (19,760 sq mi)	5,044,197	98.7/km² (255.6/sq mi)	San José
El Salvador	21,041 km^{2} (8,124 sq mi)	6,602,370	314/km² (813/sq mi)	San Salvador
Guatemala	108,889 km^{2} (42,042 sq mi)	17,980,803	165/km² (427/sq mi)	Guatemala City
Honduras	112,492 km^{2} (43,433 sq mi)	9,571,352	85.1/km² (220.4/sq mi)	Tegucigalpa
Nicaragua	130,375 km^{2} (50,338 sq mi)	6,359,689	48.8/km² (126.4/sq mi)	Managua
Panama	75,417 km^{2} (29,119 sq mi)	4,337,768	57.5/km² (148.9/sq mi)	Panama City
Total	522,284 km^{2} (201,655 sq mi)	50,337,650	96.4/km^{2} (249.6/sq mi)	

=== South America ===
In the 1960s and 1970s, the governments of Argentina, Brazil, Chile, and Uruguay were overthrown or displaced by U.S.-aligned military dictatorships. These dictatorships detained tens of thousands of political prisoners, many of whom were tortured and/or killed (on inter-state collaboration, see Operation Condor). Economically, they began a transition to neoliberal economic policies. They placed their own actions within the United States Cold War doctrine of "National Security" against internal subversion. Throughout the 1980s and 1990s, Peru suffered from an internal conflict (see Túpac Amaru Revolutionary Movement and Shining Path). Revolutionary movements and right-wing military dictatorships have been common, but starting in the 1980s a wave of democratization came through the continent, and democratic rule is widespread now. Allegations of corruption remain common, and several nations have seen crises which have forced the resignation of their presidents, although normal civilian succession has continued.

International indebtedness became a notable problem, as most recently illustrated by Argentina's default in the early 21st century. In recent years, South American governments have drifted to the left, with socialist leaders being elected in Chile, Bolivia, Brazil, Venezuela, and a leftist president in Argentina and Uruguay. Despite the move to the left, South America is still largely capitalist. With the founding of the Union of South American Nations, South America has started down the road of economic integration, with plans for political integration in the European Union style.

However, in the 2020s the political right has achieved significant electoral victories in many Latin American countries. Right-wing presidential candidates were elected in Argentina 2023, El Salvador 2024, Panama 2024, Ecuador 2025, Bolivia 2025,Chile 2025, Peru 2026 and Colombia 2026.

Country or Territory with flag	Area (km^{2}) (sq mi)	Population (2021 est.)	Population density per km^{2} (per sq mi)	Capital
Argentina	2,766,890 km^{2} (1,068,300 sq mi)	45,276,780	16.4/km² (42.5/sq mi)	Buenos Aires
Bolivia	1,098,580 km^{2} (424,160 sq mi)	12,079,472	11.0/km² (28.5/sq mi)	Sucre; La Paz
Brazil	8,514,877 km^{2} (3,287,612 sq mi)	214,326,223	25.2/km² (65.3/sq mi)	Brasília
Chile	756,950 km^{2} (292,260 sq mi)	19,493,184	25.8/km² (66.8/sq mi)	Santiago
Colombia	1,138,910 km^{2} (439,740 sq mi)	51,516,562	45.2/km² (117.1/sq mi)	Bogotá
Ecuador	283,560 km^{2} (109,480 sq mi)	17,797,737	62.8/km² (162.7/sq mi)	Quito
Falkland Islands (United Kingdom)	12,173 km^{2} (4,700 sq mi)	3,398	0.28/km² (0.73/sq mi)	Stanley
French Guiana (France)	91,000 km^{2} (35,000 sq mi)	294,071	3.23/km² (8.37/sq mi)	Cayenne
Guyana	214,999 km^{2} (83,012 sq mi)	804,567	3.74/km² (9.69/sq mi)	Georgetown
Paraguay	406,750 km^{2} (157,050 sq mi)	6,831,306	16.8/km² (43.5/sq mi)	Asunción
Peru	1,285,220 km^{2} (496,230 sq mi)	33,715,471	26.2/km² (67.9/sq mi)	Lima
(South Georgia and the South Sandwich Islands) South Georgia and South Sandwich Islands (United Kingdom)	3,093 km^{2} (1,194 sq mi)	20	0.01/km² (0.03/sq mi)	King Edward Point
Suriname	163,270 km^{2} (63,040 sq mi)	612,985	3.75/km² (9.71/sq mi)	Paramaribo
Uruguay	176,220 km^{2} (68,040 sq mi)	3,477,780	19.7/km² (51/sq mi)	Montevideo
Venezuela	916,445 km^{2} (353,841 sq mi)	28,199,867	30.8/km² (79.8/sq mi)	Caracas
Total	17,828,937 km^{2} (6,883,791 sq mi)	434,429,423	24.4/km^{2} (63.2/sq mi)	

=== Caribbean ===
Throughout the 20th century, several island countries, such as Jamaica and Barbados gained independence from British rule. As a result, many of the English-speaking states and territories shifted their economies to tourism and offshore bank industries.

During the Cold War, the Caribbean has faced a series of military interventions from the United States, such as the Banana Wars and the Cuban Missile Crisis.

Country or Territory with flag	Area (km^{2}) (sq mi)	Population (2021 est.)	Population density per km^{2} (per sq mi)	Capital
Anguilla (United Kingdom)	102 km^{2} (39 sq mi)	15,753	154.4/km² (399.9/sq mi)	The Valley
Antigua and Barbuda	442 km^{2} (171 sq mi)	93,219	210.9/km² (546.2/sq mi)	St. John's
Aruba (Netherlands)	180 km^{2} (69 sq mi)	106,537	591.9/km² (1,533/sq mi)	Oranjestad
The Bahamas	13,943 km^{2} (5,383 sq mi)	407,906	29.3/km² (75.9/sq mi)	Nassau
Bajo Nuevo Bank (United States / Colombia / Jamaica)	100 km^{2} (39 sq mi)	Uninhabited	0.0/km² (0/sq mi)	N/A
Barbados	430 km^{2} (170 sq mi)	287,025	667.5/km² (1,729/sq mi)	Bridgetown
Bonaire (Netherlands)	294 km^{2} (114 sq mi)	20,104	68.4/km² (177.2/sq mi)	Kralendijk
British Virgin Islands (United Kingdom)	151 km^{2} (58 sq mi)	31,122	206.1/km² (533.8/sq mi)	Road Town
Cayman Islands (United Kingdom)	264 km^{2} (102 sq mi)	68,136	258.1/km² (668.5/sq mi)	George Town
Cuba	109,886 km^{2} (42,427 sq mi)	11,256,372	102.4/km² (265.2/sq mi)	Havana
Curaçao (Netherlands)	444 km^{2} (171 sq mi)	190,338	428.7/km² (1,110/sq mi)	Willemstad
Dominica	751 km^{2} (290 sq mi)	72,412	96.4/km² (249.7/sq mi)	Roseau
Dominican Republic	48,671 km^{2} (18,792 sq mi)	11,117,873	228.4/km² (591.6/sq mi)	Santo Domingo
Federal Dependencies of Venezuela (Venezuela)	342 km^{2} (132 sq mi)	2,155	6.3/km² (16.3/sq mi)	N/A
Grenada	344 km^{2} (133 sq mi)	124,610	362.2/km² (938.1/sq mi)	St. George's
Guadeloupe (France)	1,620 km^{2} (630 sq mi)	396,051	244.5/km² (633.3/sq mi)	Basse-Terre
Haiti	27,750 km^{2} (10,710 sq mi)	11,447,569	412.5/km² (1,068/sq mi)	Port-au-Prince
Jamaica	10,991 km^{2} (4,244 sq mi)	2,827,695	257.3/km² (666.4/sq mi)	Kingston
Martinique (France)	1,128 km^{2} (436 sq mi)	368,796	326.9/km² (846.7/sq mi)	Fort-de-France
Montserrat (United Kingdom)	102 km^{2} (39 sq mi)	4,417	43.3/km² (112.1/sq mi)	Plymouth; Brades
Navassa Island (United States / Haiti)	5 km^{2} (1.9 sq mi)	Uninhabited	0.0/km² (0/sq mi)	Lulu Town
Puerto Rico (United States)	8,870 km^{2} (3,420 sq mi)	3,256,028	367.1/km² (950.8/sq mi)	San Juan
Saba (Netherlands)	13 km^{2} (5.0 sq mi)	1,537	118.2/km² (306.1/sq mi)	The Bottom
Saint Barthélemy (France)	21 km^{2} (8.1 sq mi)	7,448	354.7/km² (918.7/sq mi)	Gustavia
Saint Kitts and Nevis	261 km^{2} (101 sq mi)	47,606	182.4/km² (472.4/sq mi)	Basseterre
Saint Lucia	539 km^{2} (208 sq mi)	179,651	333.3/km² (863.2/sq mi)	Castries
Saint Martin (France)	54 km^{2} (21 sq mi)	29,820	552.2/km² (1,430/sq mi)	Marigot
Saint Vincent and the Grenadines	389 km^{2} (150 sq mi)	104,332	268.2/km² (694.6/sq mi)	Kingstown
Serranilla Bank (United States / Colombia / Honduras)	100 km^{2} (39 sq mi)	Uninhabited	0.0/km² (0/sq mi)	N/A
Sint Eustatius (Netherlands)	21 km^{2} (8.1 sq mi)	2,739	130.4/km² (337.7/sq mi)	Oranjestad
Sint Maarten (Netherlands)	34 km^{2} (13 sq mi)	44,042	1,296/km² (3,357/sq mi)	Philipsburg
Trinidad and Tobago	5,130 km^{2} (1,980 sq mi)	1,525,663	297.4/km² (770.3/sq mi)	Port of Spain
Turks and Caicos Islands (United Kingdom)	948 km^{2} (366 sq mi)	45,144	47.6/km² (123.3/sq mi)	Cockburn Town
United States Virgin Islands (United States)	347 km^{2} (134 sq mi)	100,091	288.4/km² (747.1/sq mi)	Charlotte Amalie
Total	234,667 km^{2} (90,605 sq mi)	44,182,191	188.3/km^{2} (487.6/sq mi)	

== See also ==
- History of Latin America–United States relations
- History of the west coast of North America
- History of Latin America
- History of the Southern United States
- American frontier
- History of New England
- List of conflicts in The Americas
- Spanish Empire
- Portuguese Empire
- List of oldest buildings in the Americas
