= Lully (disambiguation) =

Jean-Baptiste Lully (1632–1687) was an Italian-born French composer.

Lully may also refer to:

== Places ==
=== Switzerland ===
- Lully, Fribourg, a municipality
- Lully, Vaud, a municipality

=== France ===
- Lully, Haute-Savoie

=== Antarctica ===
- Lully Foothills

== People ==
- Jean-Baptiste Lully (1632–1687), Italian-born French opera composer of the Baroque period
  - Louis Lully (1664–1734), his oldest son
  - Jean-Baptiste Lully fils (1665–1743), his second son
  - Jean-Louis Lully (1667–1688), his third son
- Ramon Llull or Raymond Lully (c. 1230–1315), late medieval Spanish writer and philosopher

== See also ==
- Lulli (disambiguation)
- Luli (disambiguation)
