= Lulli (disambiguation) =

Jean-Baptiste Lully (1632–1687), born Giovanni Battista Lulli, was an Italian-born French composer.

Lulli may also refer to:

== People ==
- Arthur de Lulli, the pen name of British composer Euphemia Allen, who wrote the "Chopsticks" waltz
- Folco Lulli (1912–1970), an Italian partisan and film actor, brother of Piero
- Luca Lulli (born 1991), an Italian footballer
- Piero Lulli (1923–1991), an Italian film actor, brother of Folco

== Media ==
- Lulli (film), a 2021 Brazilian comedy-drama film

== See also ==
- Lully (disambiguation)
- Luli (disambiguation)
