= Loulou =

Loulou may refer to:

== People ==
- Enver Hoxha, Communist leader of Albania from 1944 until his death in 1985
- Louise Lévêque de Vilmorin
- Loulou de la Falaise, French fashion muse and designer.

== Other uses ==
- Loulou (film), a 1980 French film directed by Maurice Pialat
- LOU LOU, a Canadian women's magazine
- Loulou, a 1989 children's picture book by Grégoire Solotareff

== See also ==
- Lulu (disambiguation)
- Lulou
- Loulu
