= Gladys L. Catchings =

American nurse (1901–1992)

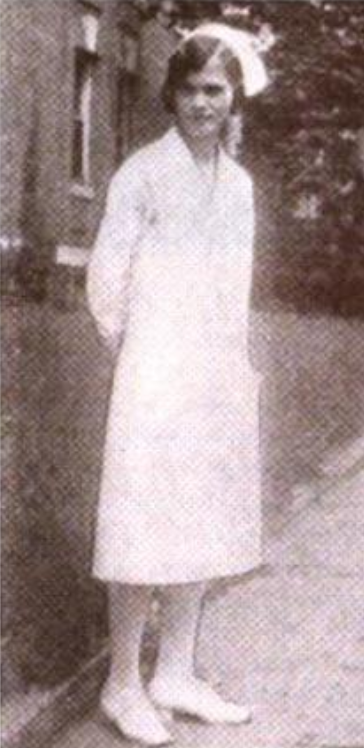
- Gladys L. Catchings, from a 1928 publication
- Born: April 27, 1901; Georgetown, Quitman County, Georgia
- Died: September 24, 1992 (age 91); Chicago, Illinois
- Occupation(s): Nurse, nurse educator, hospital administrator

Gladys L. Catchings (April 27, 1901 – September 24, 1992) was an American nurse, hospital administrator, and nurse educator. She was at the center of a 1928 controversy when she was accepted for post-graduate work at Sloane Hospital for Women in New York City, then lost her place when her race became known.

== Early life and education ==
Catchings was born in Georgetown, Georgia, the daughter of Walter Titus Catchings Sr. and Lucy Davis Catchings. She completed her nursing training at the Howard University's Freedmen's Hospital in 1922. She was one of the twelve founding members (known as "Jewels") of the Chi Eta Phi, a nursing sorority. She earned a master's degree in nursing from Catholic University of America.

== Career ==
Catchings was a registered nurse. She taught at the Tuskegee Institute, and was head nurse of the obstetrics department at Freedmen's Hospital in Washington, D.C. In 1928 she was accepted for graduate coursework at Sloane Hospital for Women in New York City. When she arrived, she was the only Black nurse at Sloane; after she attended one class, Sloane removed her from the course because she was Black. The National Association for the Advancement of Colored People (NAACP) objected, saying the hospital's action was "un-American", and stating that "It is well known that there is need of more colored doctors and nurses in this country. It is also well known that the opportunities accorded them for the full and adequate education and training they are eager to have are exceedingly limited." The case made headlines nationwide. Catchings' experience was discussed in the context of other publicized racial discrimination incidents at the hospital.

Later in her career, Catchings was a nurse in the District of Columbia Public Schools, until she retired in 1966. From 1966 to 1969, she was head nurse at the Hebrew Home for the Aged.

== Personal life ==
Catchings retired to Georgia, but moved to Chicago for her last years, and died there in 1992, at the age of 91.
