= Margaret E. Bailey =

African American nurse (1915–2014)

Col Margaret E. Bailey
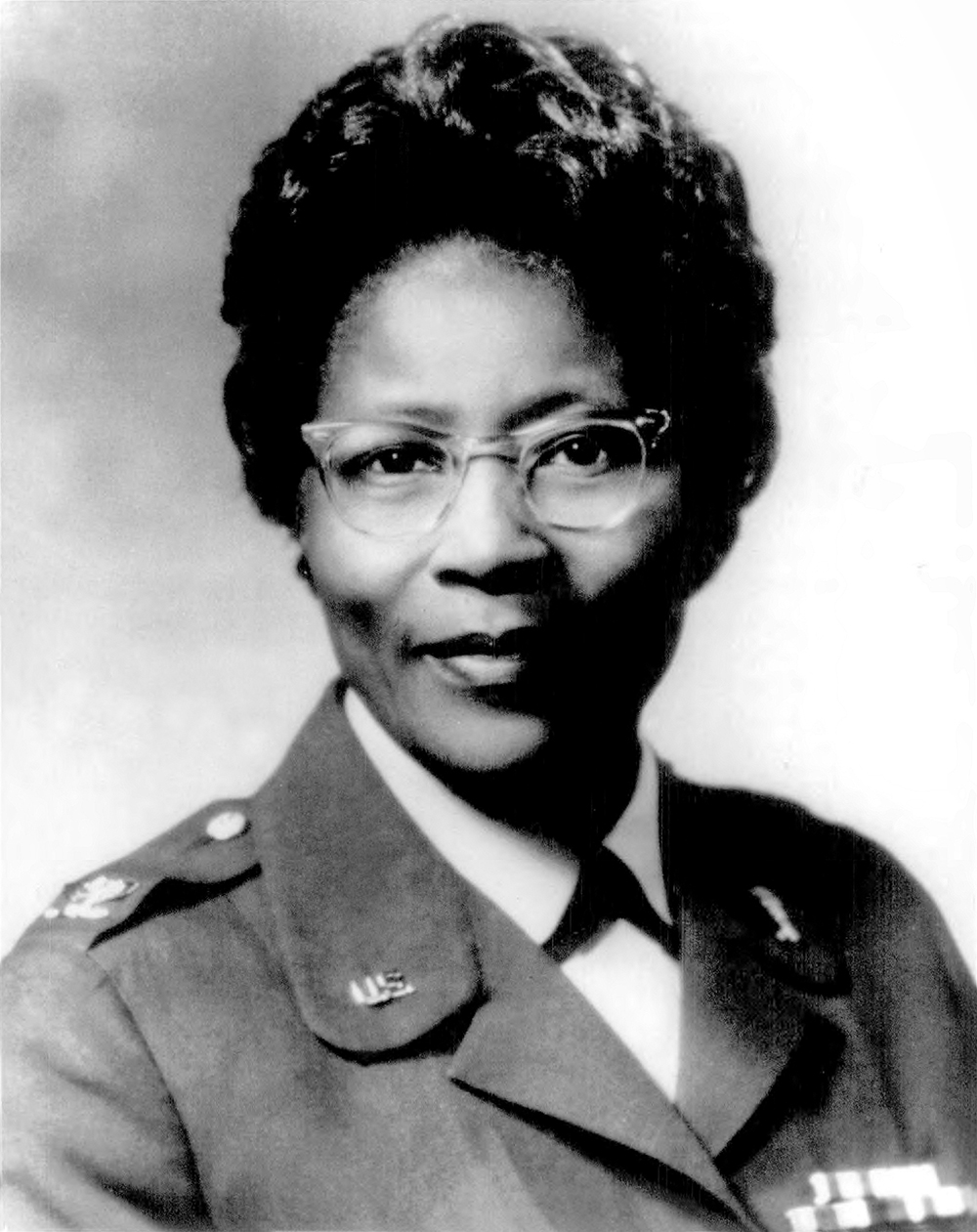
- Born: December 25, 1915; Selma, Alabama, US
- Died: August 28, 2014 (aged 98); Washington, D.C., US
- Burial place: Arlington National Cemetery Section 55 Site 1081
- Military career
- Allegiance: United States
- Branch: United States Army
- Service years: 1944 – 1971
- Rank: Colonel
- Unit: United States Army Nurse Corps
- Conflict: World War II
- Awards: Legion of Merit; Army Commendation Medal; World War II Victory Medal; American Campaign Medal; National Defense Medal

Margaret E. Bailey (December 25, 1915 – August 28, 2014) was a United States Army Nurse Corps colonel. She served in the Corps for 27 years, from July 1944 to July 1971, nine of which she served in France, Germany, and Japan. During her career, Bailey advanced from a second lieutenant to colonel, the highest achievable military rank in the Nurse Corps. She set several landmarks for black nurses in US military, becoming the first black lieutenant colonel in 1964, the first black chief nurse in a mixed, non-segregated unit in 1966, and the first black full colonel in 1967.

During World War II, Bailey treated German prisoners of war. In the later years of her military career, she actively worked with minority organizations and advocated to increase black participation in the Corps. After her retirement from the Army, she served as a consultant to the Surgeon General in the Nixon administration, working to increase the number of minorities in the Nurse Corps. For many years, she made speeches supporting equal participation in United States Army across the United States.

== Early life ==
Bailey grew up in one of the most segregated areas of the South. She was born in Selma, Alabama, on December 25, 1915. Her father, Adam Bailey, died when she was eight years old, and her mother, Hattie Bailey, moved the family to Mobile, Alabama. There, Bailey graduated from W.H. Council Elementary School, then from Emerson Junior High School, and in 1933, from Dunbar High School. As a child, Bailey walked past a local hospital on her way to school, and tidy look of medical personnel prompted her ambition to become a nurse. During the Great Depression, Bailey worked on school nights and Saturdays to help her family. After graduating from Dunbar High School, she worked for two years to save enough money to further her education. In 1935, she was accepted to the Fraternal Hospital School of Nursing in Montgomery, Alabama.

== Civilian nursing career (1938 – 1944) ==
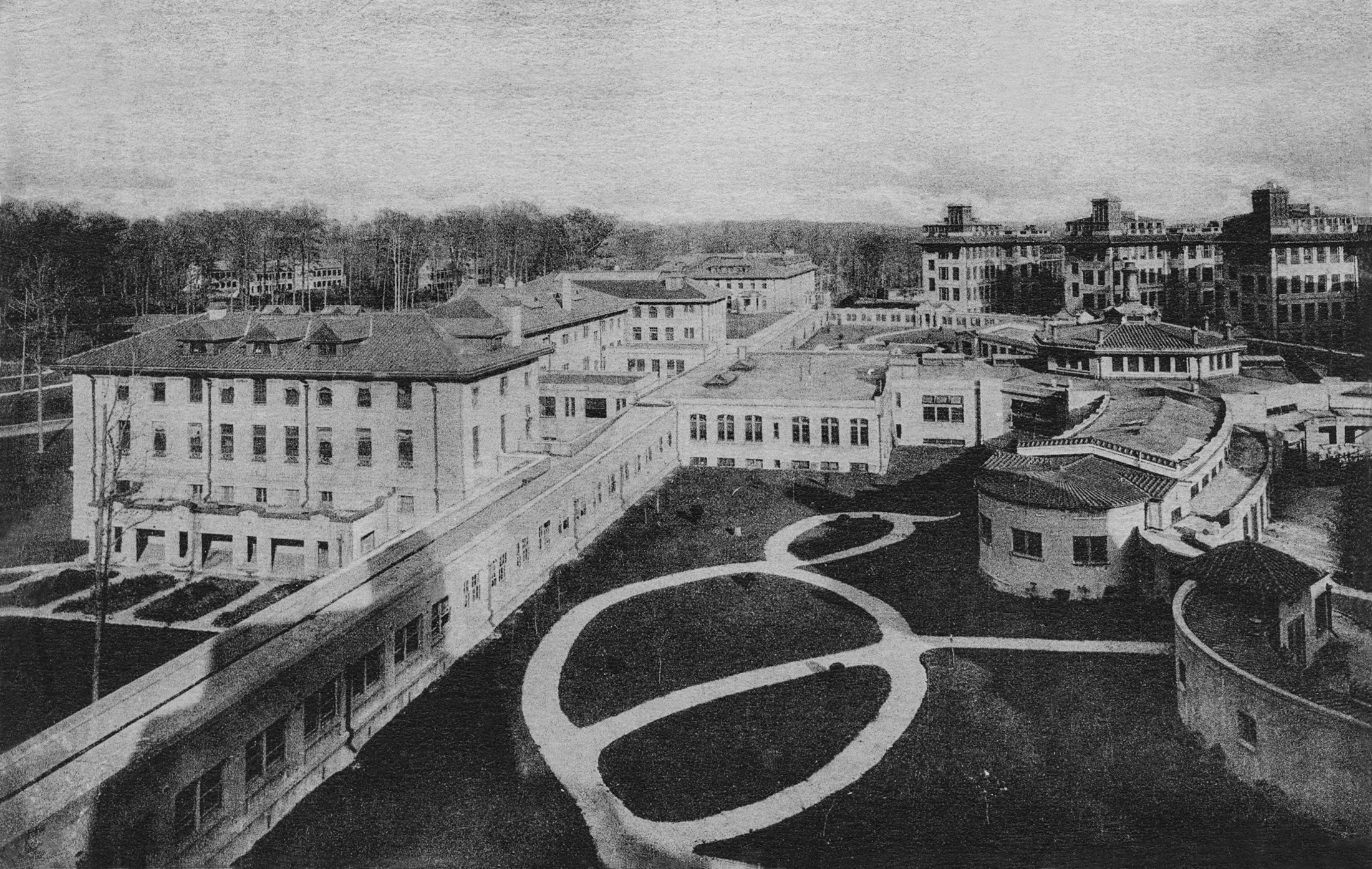
Seaview Hospital c.1940

In 1938, Bailey graduated from the nursing school and found a job at Mercy Hospital in St. Petersburg, Florida, then the only primary care facility for the local Black community.

This was career success, as opportunities for black women in the South were scarce, and generally limited to cleaning, teaching, or nursing, all strictly within segregated facilities for black people. However, a year later, in September 1939, Bailey surprised her colleagues and became the first black nurse to voluntarily resign her position at Mercy Hospital. She had found a better nursing position at Seaview Hospital on Staten Island, New York.

At the time, this hospital was the nation's largest facility, specializing in the treatment of tuberculosis, and the most expensive municipal medical establishment in the United States. Unlike Mercy Hospital in Florida, Seaview Hospital was non-segregated, and already had a history of promoting black nurses to supervising positions.

Bailey worked at Seaview Hospital for almost five years, until she decided to enlist in US military in the summer of 1944.

== Military career (1944 – 1971) ==
Bailey joined the United States Army Nurse Corps in June 1944, at the start of Normandy landings. She was motivated by the raging world war, and believed that wounded Americans would need her help. At the time, the US military was segregated, and the Army Nurse Corps was reluctant to admit black nurses at all until 1941, when the first blacks were accepted under pressure from the National Association of Colored Graduate Nurses and Eleanor Roosevelt personally. Still, at the end of 1943, only 183 black nurses served in a Corps of 52,000 nurses, and they routinely faced discrimination.

Bailey was assigned to "all-Negro unit" in the Corps. Ironically, the start of Bailey's military career brought her not to the European theater, but to Arizona where she completed basic training at Fort Huachuca and received her entry rank of second lieutenant. Then she was assigned to Station Hospital in Florence, Arizona, to care for German prisoners of war.

In subsequent years, Bailey served as both medical and surgical nurse at numerous domestic and international facilities, including in France, Germany, and Japan. Despite intermittent racial discrimination, Bailey gradually advanced through the ranks. In 1950, she completed a six-month psychiatric nursing course at Brooke Army Medical Center, which led to her promotion to captain. Undeterred by frequent transfers, Bailey started taking evening university courses wherever she was, slowly earning a university degree. Over the next nine years, she accumulated enough credits from the University of Michigan, the University of Maryland in Germany, and the San Francisco State College to receive her bachelor's degree in nursing from the San Francisco State College in 1959.

On July 15, 1964, after 20 years of service, Bailey was promoted to lieutenant colonel, becoming the first black nurse to achieve such rank. In May 1965 (as the Army's segregation policy ended), she was transferred to the 130th General Hospital in Chinon, France, her first assignment in a mixed-race unit. In 1966, she became the chief nurse of the unit and the first black nurse to lead a non-segregated unit.

In February 1969, Bailey received the Army Commendation Medal from the hands of General John H. Cushman. Later that year, she was transferred to Washington D.C. as a Health Manpower Training Specialist with the Department of Labor. In January 1970, Bailey became the first black person to attain the rank of colonel, the highest military rank possible within the United States Army Nurse Corps.

Bailey retired in July, 1971, after 27 years of service, nine of which she served outside the United States. She was regarded as an "exemplary professional officer." Upon her retirement, she was awarded the Legion of Merit, the second highest non-combat award. During her service, she reached the highest rank possible within her Corps, witnessed the end of the Army's policy of segregation, and visited 27 countries. In the final years of her military career, Bailey devoted more and more time to recruiting black women to the Nurse Corps.

Bailey's selected military postings
Facility	Location	Note
Fort Huachuca	(United States) Cochise County, Arizona	
Station Hospital	(United States) Florence, Arizona	
Camp Beale	(United States) Marysville, California	
Halloran General Hospital	(United States) Staten Island, New York	
Fort Dix	(United States) Trenton, New Jersey	
Madigan Army Medical Center	(United States) Lakewood, Washington	
Fort Sam Houston	(United States) San Antonio, Texas	Completed a six-month psychiatric nursing course at Brooke Army Medical Center in 1950.
Percy Jones Army Hospital	(United States) Battle Creek, Michigan	Completed courses at the University of Michigan Kalamazoo which later counted towards her bachelor's degree in nursing.
98th General Hospital	Munich, Germany	Completed courses at the University of Maryland extension in Germany which later counted towards her bachelor's degree in nursing.
Letterman General Hospital	(United States) San Francisco	In 1959, received Bachelor of Arts in Nursing from the San Francisco State University after accumulating credits from multiple universities.
Fitzsimmons Army Hospital	(United States) Aurora, Colorado	Was in charge of Nightingale program, recruiting nurses for the Army.
2nd General Hospital	Landstuhl, Germany	
Camp Zama	Japan	Served as assistant chief nurse, then head nurse on the officers' ward.
130th General Hospital	Chinon, France	In 1966, served as a Chief of Nursing Service.
33rd Field Hospital	Wurzburg, Germany	Served as Chief of Nursing Service.
Fort Devens	(United States) Middlesex County, Massachusetts	Served as a Chief of Nursing Service in 1968.
Based on Robert Ewell Greene's compilation.

== Political career and social activism ==
In the early years of her Army career, especially during her stations abroad, Bailey frequently encountered people who had never worked with or even seen a black woman before. She enjoyed taking extra steps to educate these people about black culture, believing these actions to be important steps towards integration. In her later years, Bailey enthusiastically supported recruiting more black women into the Army. While stationed in Aurora, Colorado, she was in contact with local women's rights organizations and was in charge of the official military Nightingale program (named after Florence Nightingale and publicly advocated for minority recruitment to the Nurse Corps.

Bailey was in the "vanguard of the integration movement." As the policy of segregation in the Army ended in 1965, she called it "difficult yet rewarding milestone". Yet, at that time only 6.6% of the Nurse Corps were black, so Bailey continued her efforts to increase black participation.

After her retirement from the Army, on July 1, 1972, Bailey accepted the position of Consultant to the Surgeon General with the special responsibility to promote increased participation of minorities the in Army Nurse Corps. This assignment was commended by the National Association for the Advancement of Colored People, which witnessed the Nixon administration promote Bailey and 155 other black public servants to government positions.

In the last years of her military service and throughout her retirement, Bailey regularly made speeches in black communities to promote integration and military service. For example, on February 27, 2000, 84-year-old Bailey traveled from her Washington, D.C., home to Alabama to speak at the Shiloh Missionary Baptist Church. On occasion, Bailey partnered with Clara Adams-Ender to advocate for more black participation in the Army. Baily was a speaker at the National Black Nurses Association's summit in 1998 and took part in international conferences in South Africa and Botswana.

In 1999, Bailey completed and published her autobiography The Challenge. She was also an active member of Chi Eta Phi, a professional organization of registered nurses and nursing students.

== Awards ==
Bailey received multiple awards and commendations both for her Army service and her activism. Her Army medals included the World War II Victory Medal, American Campaign Medal, National Defense Medal, Army Commendation Medal, and Legion of Merit, the second highest non-combat military award.

In 1967 and 1969, she was named the Woman of the Year by several women's organizations.

== Death ==
Bailey died on August 28, 2014, in Washington, D.C. She was buried on Arlington National Cemetery.

== Bibliography ==
- Bailey, Margaret E. (1999), The Challenge – Autobiography of Margaret E. Bailey, First Black Nurse Promoted to Colonel in the Army Nurse Corps, Lisle: Tucker Publications, ISBN 0923950176, LCCN 99071117, OCLC 45242626

== See also ==
- Clara Adams-Ender
- United States Army Nurse Corps
- Florence Nightingale

== Literature cited ==
- "Lt Col Bailey cited at Devens", Boston Globe, Boston: Boston Globe Media Partners, p. 19, February 5, 1969, ISSN 0743-1791, LCCN sn83045150, OCLC 1536853
- "Mrs. Catlett lauds Nixon", Montclair Times, Montclair: A. C. Studer, p. 12, May 14, 1970, OCLC 13200616
- Welham, Walter, ed. (September 1, 1972), "Colonel Bailey holds new post", Military Medicine, vol. 137, no. 9, Washington: Association of Military Surgeons, p. 368, ISSN 0026-4075, LCCN 09019395, OCLC 1641787
- "Chi Eta Phi Sorors hold interim board", New Pittsburgh Courier, Pittsburgh: New Pittsburgh Courier Pub. Co., p. 13, December 22, 1973, ISSN 1047-8051, LCCN sn84025931, OCLC 7476291
- Rywell, Martin; Wesley, Charles H., eds. (1974), Afro-American encyclopedia (1 ed.), North Miami: Educational Book Publishers, LCCN 70094684, OCLC 1021429
- "Shiloh celebrates Black History", The Sentinel, Carlisle: Cumberland Publishers, p. 15, February 25, 2000, ISSN 0887-0802, OCLC 13079923
- "Colonel addresses crowd", The Sentinel, Carlisle: Cumberland Publishers, p. 7, February 28, 2000, ISSN 0887-0802, OCLC 13079923
- "Margaret E. Bailey", mcguire-services.com, Washington: McGuire Funeral Service, Inc., August 28, 2014
- Baron, Martin, ed. (September 7, 2014), "Death notice: Bailey", Washington Post, Washington: Nash Holdings, pp. C8, ISSN 0740-5421, LCCN sn83004644, OCLC 9965758
- Brown, Geraldine (September 1, 2014), Brown, Geraldine (ed.), "Remembering Col. Margaret E. Bailey, Ret. US Army", ABNF Journal, vol. 25, no. 4, Association of Black Nursing Faculty, Inc., p. 129, ISSN 1046-7041, OCLC 181818728
- Carnegie, Mary Elizabeth (1986), Hill, Paul R.; Ewan, Helen (eds.), The Path We Tread: Blacks in Nursing, 1854-1984, Philadelphia: J. B. Lippincott & Co, ISBN 0397546025, LCCN 85024181, OCLC 869154030
- Feller, Carolyn M.; Moore, Constance J. (1996), Highlights in the History of the Army Nurse Corps, CMH pub, vol. 85 (1 ed.), Washington: United States Army Center of Military History, LCCN 96132383, OCLC 34974802
- Greene, Robert Ewell (1974), Black Defenders of America, Chicago: Johnson Publishing Company, ISBN 0874850533, LCCN 73015607, OCLC 703223
- Gregory, Ted (May 28, 2001), Lipinski, Ann Marie (ed.), "Forgotten war nurses keep their story alive", Chicago Tribune, Chicago: Tribune Publishing, pp. 1, 16, ISSN 1085-6706, LCCN sn83045111, OCLC 7960181
- Jackson, Kathi (2000), They called them angels: American military nurses of World War II, Westport: Praeger, ISBN 0275968995, LCCN 99059563, OCLC 42976837
- Jones, Philip H. (February 5, 2009), "African-American 'firsts' key to Army history", United States Army, Arlington County: United States Armed Forces
- King, Mary Sarah (October 6, 1968), "Business Women's Week puts focus on careers", Boston Globe, Boston: Boston Globe Media Partners, p. 130, ISSN 0743-1791, LCCN sn83045150, OCLC 1536853
- Knight, Candy (February 14, 2014), "Overcoming barriers: African-American women in the military", United States Air Force, Arlington County: United States Armed Forces
- Nonko, Emily (December 12, 2016), Baker, Gerard (ed.), "Former Tuberculosis Hospital Complex on Staten Island Is Up for Development", Wall Street Journal, New York: Dow Jones & Company, Inc., ISSN 0099-9660, LCCN 2004233786, OCLC 782073794
- Nowak, Michael (2005), "Vietnam", in Hine, Darlene Clark (ed.), Black women in America, vol. 3 (2 ed.), New York: Oxford University Press, pp. 276–281, ISBN 0195223764, LCCN 2005001532, OCLC 61527810
- Sarnecky, Mary T. (2010), A contemporary history of the U.S. Army Nurse Corps, Washington: Office of the Surgeon General, Borden Institute, Walter Reed Army Medical Center, ISBN 978-0160851254, LCCN 2010000862, OCLC 712160034
- Staupers, Mabel K. (February 1, 1942), Geister, Janet M. (ed.), "The Negro Nurse Advances", Trained Nurse and Hospital Review, vol. 55, New York: Lakeside Publishing Company, pp. 112–114, ISSN 0893-3251, OCLC 1767687
- Thompson, Kathleen (1997), "Bailey, Margaret E.", in Hine, Darlene Clark; Thompson, Kathleen (eds.), Facts On File Encyclopedia of Black Women in America: Science, Health, and Medicine, vol. 11, New York: Facts on File, p. 37, ISBN 0816034281, LCCN 96033268, OCLC 934936907
- Townsend, Phela (2005), "Colonel Margaret Bailey", in Jackson, Gerald G. (ed.), We're not going to take it anymore: educational and psychological practices from an Africentric paradigm of helping, Silver Spring: Beckham, pp. 228–230, ISBN 0931761840, OCLC 173083091
- Word, Dorothy (October 1, 1998), "Honor is long overdue", Kokomo Tribune, Kokomo: Thomson Corporation, p. 9, ISSN 0746-2034, LCCN sn82003376, OCLC 8801387
