= Lulu =

Lulu or Lu Lu may refer to:

== Companies ==
- LuLu, an early automobile manufacturer
- LuLu the Piggy, a brand of collectible toys
- Lulu.com, an online e-books and print self-publishing platform, distributor, and retailer
- Lulu Hypermarket, a retail chain in Asia
- Lululemon, a Canadian athletic apparel company

== Places ==
- Lulu, Florida, US, an unincorporated community
- Lulu City, Colorado, US, a mining town abandoned in 1885
- Lulu, Missouri, an unincorporated community
- Lulu Bay, a bay on Navassa Island in the Caribbean
- Lulu Town, a town on Navassa Island in the Caribbean
- Lulu Island, an island which comprises most of Richmond, British Columbia, Canada
- Al Lulu Island, also known as Lulu Island, a man-made island off the coast of Abu Dhabi island
- Lulu Roundabout, in Manama, Bahrain

== Theatre, film, opera ==
- The two plays by Frank Wedekind whose protagonist is named Lulu:
  - Earth Spirit (play) (Erdgeist, 1895)
  - Pandora's Box (play) (Die Büchse der Pandora, 1904)
- Works based on them include:
  - Lulu (opera), a 1935 opera by Alban Berg
  - Lulu (1962 film), an Austrian film by Rolf Thiele
  - Lulu (1980 film), a film directed by Walerian Borowczyk
  - Pandora's Box (1929 film) directed by Georg Wilhelm Pabst based on both Wedekind plays

And unrelated to the Wedekind story:

- Lulu (Kuhlau opera), an 1824 Danish opera by Friedrich Kuhlau based on same fairy tale as Mozart's Magic Flute
- Lulu (1914 film), an Italian silent film directed by Augusto Genina
- Lulu (1917 film), a 1917 German silent film
- Lulu (1918 film), a Hungarian silent film directed by Michael Curtiz
- Lulù (1953 film), an Italian film directed by Fernando Cerchio
- Lulu (1996 film), a Canadian film directed by Srinivas Krishna
- Lulu (2002 film), a French film starring Jean-Pierre Kalfon
- Lulu (2005 film), a Dutch film featuring Georgina Verbaan
- Lulu (2006 film), a German TV film featuring Matthias Schweighöfer
- Lulu (2014 film), an Argentine film
- Lulu the Movie, a 2016 Singaporean film written, directed by and starring Michelle Chong

== Music ==
- Lulu (1973 album), by Scottish singer Lulu
- Lulu (1981 album), by Scottish singer Lulu
- Lulu Belle and Scotty, stage name of Myrtle Eleanor Cooper (1913–1999) (and Scott Greene Wiseman), a major country music act of the 1930s and 1940s
- Lulu (Trip Shakespeare album) (1991)
- Lulu (Lou Reed and Metallica album) (2011), based on the Wedekind plays
- LuLu and the TomCat, Canadian children's musical group

== People ==
- Lulu (name)
- Lu'lu', the Arabic given name
- Lulu (singer) (born 1948), Scottish singer and actress
- Elizabeth Michael, Tanzanian actress also known as Lulu
- Li Xiaolu (born 1982), Chinese actress known as Lu Lu
- Lulu and Nana (born 2018), pseudonyms for twin Chinese girls, allegedly the first humans produced from embryos that were genome edited
- Lubjana Piovesana (born 1997), British and Austrian judoka known as Lulu
- Lu Lu (badminton) (born 1990), Chinese badminton player
- Paddy Roe, Australian writer known as Lulu
- Lulu Kennedy, (born 1969), British fashion entrepreneur

== Other uses ==
- Lulu (app), a mobile app that lets women rate men
- Lulu (dog), guide dog of blind hiker Trevor Thomas
- Locally unwanted land use (LULU), a public-policy planning term
- LuLu International Shopping Mall in Kochi, Kerala, India
- Lulu Convention Centre, Thrissur, Kerala, India
- Mk 101 Lulu, a nuclear depth charge formerly used by the US

== See also ==
- Land use, land-use change, and forestry (LULUCF)
- Loulou (disambiguation)
- Lulu smoothing, a non-linear mathematical smoothing technique
- Lulu on the Bridge, a film by Paul Auster
- Lula (disambiguation)
- Lulou
- Loulu
