= Lu'lu' =

Lu'lu' (Arabic: لؤلؤ, romanized: Luʾluʾ, meaning 'pearl') is used as a given male or female name. It may refer to:

- Lu'lu' al-Kabir (died 1008/9), minister and emir of Aleppo
- Mansur ibn Lu'lu', emir of Aleppo (1008–1016), son of prec.
- Lu'lu' al-Yaya (died 1117), atabeg of Aleppo
- Badr al-Din Lu'lu', ruler of Mosul (1211–1259)

== See also ==
- Lulu (disambiguation), including similar names
