= Chi Eta Phi =

International nursing professional sorority

- ΧΗΦ
- Founded: October 16, 1932; 93 years ago Freedman's Hospital, Washington, D. C.
- Type: Professional
- Affiliation: Independent
- Status: Active
- Emphasis: Nursing
- Scope: National
- Motto: "Service for Humanity"
- Colors: Pea green and Lemon Yellow
- Flower: White Chrysanthemum with Ivy
- Mascot: Turtle
- Publication: The Glowing Lamp
- Chapters: 50 undergraduate and 101+ graduate
- Members: 8,000 lifetime
- Headquarters: 3029 13th Street; Washington, D.C. 20009; United States
- Website: www.chietaphi.org

Chi Eta Phi Sorority, Inc. (ΧΗΦ) is an American professional service organization for registered professional nurses and student nurses, representing many cultures and diverse ethnic backgrounds. Sarah Killian, DNP, RN is the current national president.

== History ==
Chi Eta Phi Sorority Nursing Sorority was founded on October 16, 1932, at Freedman's Hospital School of Nursing in Washington D.C., now known as Howard University Hospital. The organization's foundation was based on concerns, at that time, which regarded restrictions in the employment of black nurses to segregated facilities and hospitals, and menial positions where there was little to no chance of advancement in the profession. African Americans were also unable to join most professional organizations. The Chi Eta Phi founders sought to encourage African Americans to pursue a career in nursing and to enhance the status of Black nurses.

The charter chapter, Alpha, was founded and organized by Ailene Carrington Ewell, RN, with the assistance of eleven other black registered nurses, collectively known as the "Jewels". The founders were Clara E. Beverly, Lillian Mosely Boswell, Gladys Louise Catchings, Bessie Foster Cephas, Henrietta Smith Chisholm, Susan Elizabeth Freeman, Ruth Turner Garrett, Olivia Larkins Howard, Mildred Wood Lucas, Clara Belle Royster, and Katherine Chandler Turner. The sorority was incorporated in the District of Columbia in May 1932. Its first executive secretary was Mabel Keaton Staupers.

Originally, the sorority's membership was limited to female Black nurses. Members offered local health screenings, provided health education, raised funds to provide scholarships for nursing students, and provided those in need within their communities with clothing, food, and money. The sorority also raised funds to start and operated a health clinic in Monrovia, Liberia.

Chi Eta Phi became affiliated with the National Council of Negro Women. Under the leadership of the Building Fund chair, Thelma Harris, the sorority purchased its national headquarters building at 3029 13th Street in Washington, D.C., in 1971. That same year, the sorority established the Board of Directors of Chi Eta Phi Sorority, Inc., which held its first meeting in November 1971. In August 1973, the sorority and the American Nurses Association added a monument to the grave of Mary Eliza Mahoney, considered the first Black professional nurse in the United States.

The sorority welcomed its first male member in 1977. Today, Chi Eta Phi is a professional organization, rather than a sorority, and its membership is no longer restricted by race or gender. It belongs to the American Nurses Association's Nursing Organizational Liaison Forum. In 2010, it had initiated 8,000 members and had formed 90 graduate chapters and 50 undergraduate chapters.

== Symbols ==
The name Chi Eta Phi was chosen for its Greek letters which stand for Character, Education, and Friendship. The sorority's colors are pea green and lemon yellow. Its flower is the white chrysanthemum with ivy. Its mascot is the turtle, chosen because it is determined, persevering, a risk taker, sure-footed, and purposefully directed. Its motto is "Service for Humanity".

Its journal, The Glowing Lamp, connects to the symbol used to represent Florence Nightingale, the founder of modern nursing. The organization's crest is topped by the glowing lamp and features the Cadueceus, the staff carried by Hermes, the herald of the Greek gods who oversaw art of healing or medicine.

== Activities ==
The sorority's programs focus on health promotion/disease prevention, leadership development, mentoring, recruitment, retention, and scholarship. These programs include national, regional, and local conferences, seminars, and workshops; consumer health education programs throughout different communities; leadership development programs/summits focusing on continuing education; recruitment and retention of nursing students; and award recognition of outstanding nurses.

The organization has relationships with many civic, professional, and educational groups including the American Nurses' Association, the National Council of Negro Women, the United Negro College Fund, the National Association for the Advancement of Colored People, the Sickle Cell Disease Association of America, the American Cancer Society, the National Cancer Institute, and the National Institute on Drug Abuse, and the Adolescent Pregnancy Child Watch program. Its members also volunteer for Student Nurses Tutorial Project.

=== Publications ===
Chi Eta Phi's publications include:

- Chi Line, semi-annual newsletter
- The Glowing Lamp, Journal of Chi Eta Phi Sorority, annual peer-reviewed

Charles Dawson, artist and residence at the Tuskegee Institute and curator of the George Washington Carver Museum designed the cover of The Glowing Lamp. The sorority has also published a few books:

- The History of the Chi Eta Phi Sorority, Inc.1932–1967 (1968)
- Mary Eliza Mahoney, America's First Black Professional Nurse (1986) ISBN 978-0935087130
- Lillian H. Harvey 1912-1994: A Short Biography (1996) ISBN 0-9625901-0-X
- The History of the Chi Eta Phi Sorority, Inc.: Vol. II 1968–1997 (1998)
- The Nurse in the Kitchen (2010) ISBN 978-1449065492

== Membership ==
Membership in Chi Eta Phi is by invitation and is both active and honorary. Membership is open to nursing students and registered professional nurses. Membership is not restricted by race, gender, or ethnicity.

== Chapters ==
The graduate and undergraduate (Beta) chapters are grouped into five regions according to geographic areas. Over 101 graduate and 41 undergraduate chapters have been formed across the United States, in Saint Thomas, U.S. Virgin Islands, and in Monrovia, Liberia.

== Notable members ==
- Margaret E. Bailey, United States Army Nurse Corps colonel.
- Gladys L. Catchings (Alpha, 1932), nurse, hospital administrator, and nurse educator
- Mary Starke Harper (1996), nurse who worked in bedside nursing, nurse research and health policy
- Mary Eliza Mahoney (Alpha, 1979, posthumous honorary), first Black professional nurse in the United States
- Estelle Massey Osborne (Omicron, honorary), nurse and educator
- Lula Warlick, nurse, educator, and nursing administrator
