= Luli (disambiguation) =

Luli may refer to:

== People ==
- Luli, was a king of the Phoenician city of Tyre (729–694 BC).
- Luli Bitri, an Albanian actress
- Luli Deste, German-American actress
- Luli Oswald, Brazilian pianist and piano teacher
- Ded Gjo Luli, Albanian guerilla fighter; commander during the 1911 revolt against the Ottoman Empire
- He Luli, Chinese paediatrician and politician (1934–2022)
- Oltion Luli, an Albanian sprinter

== Places ==
- Hoseynabad-e Luli, a Village in Kerman, Iran

== Other uses ==
Luli may stand for:

- LULI - (Laboratoire pour l'Utilisation des Lasers Intenses) is a scientific research laboratory specialised in the study of plasmas generated by laser-matter interaction
- Lulli (film), a Brazilian comedy-drama film directed by César Rodrigues

== See also ==
- Lul (disambiguation)
- Lule (disambiguation)
- Lulism
- Lullism
