= Hoseynabad-e Luli =

Hoseynabad-e Luli حسين ابادلولي
- Village
- Location within Iran
- Coordinates: 28°28′54″N 57°42′56″E
- Country: Iran
- Province: Kerman
- County: Anbarabad
- Bakhsh: Central
- Rural District: Mohammadabad

Population (2006)
  - Total: 289
- Time zone: UTC+3:30 (IRST)
  - Summer (DST): UTC+4:30 (IRDT)

Hoseynabad-e Luli (Persian: حسين ابادلولي, also Romanized as Ḩoseynābād-e Lūlī) is a village in Mohammadabad Rural District, in the Central District of Anbarabad County, Kerman Province, Iran. At the 2006 census, its population was 289, in 62 families.
