= Mary Starke Harper =

African American nurse (1919–2006)

Mary Starke Harper (September 6, 1919 – July 27, 2006) was an African American nurse who worked in bedside nursing, nurse research and health policy. She spent several years working for the Department of Veterans Affairs. She performed clinical research on the geriatric psychiatric population and minority health. In 1972, Harper created the NIMH Minority Fellowship Program. She served on four presidential administration advisory panels with regards to mental health and health care reform. She died in 2006 as the recipient of several honors and author of over 180 publications.

== Early life ==
Mary Starke Harper was born in Fort Mitchell, Alabama on September 6, 1919 and later moved to Phenix City. She was the oldest of seven other siblings in her family. As a child, she enjoyed reading, studying and raising mice to sell to nearby laboratories and hospitals. Though her parents wanted her to settle down as a housewife, she decided to attend pursue a business administration degree at Tuskegee Institute. Her father died when she was in college and after his passing she switched her major to nursing. She later became George Washington Carver's private nurse before he died in 1943.

== Education ==
Mary Starke Harper attended Tuskegee Institute and earned a diploma in nursing in 1941. She later applied to several bachelor's programs in the late 1940s. The University of Alabama rejected Harper's application on the basis of her race and she decided to attend the University of Minnesota instead, a school which at the time had never had a black woman graduate from their program. In 1950, she graduated from the University of Minnesota with a bachelor's degree in education. In 1952, she earned her master's degree with honors in nursing education and educational psychology. In 1963, Harper graduated from St. Louis University with a doctorate in medical sociology and clinical psychology.

== Tuskegee Syphilis Study ==
When Harper 19-years-old and enrolled at Tuskegee Institute earning her diploma in nursing, she volunteered at the "Tuskegee Study of Untreated Syphilis in the Negro Male." As a young nurse, she did not know the extent of the study or that several of her patients were denied treatment. In 2003, approximately 60 years later, Harper recounted, "I was very angry that they had me, a black person, doing something bad to black men." She claimed her involvement in the study sparked her interest in the treatment of minority populations. This experience prompted her to become an advocate for minority health care for both geriatric and psychiatric populations. Later, she assumed a teaching role and trained minority patients about informed consent and the importance of asking questions about research before agreeing to participate.

== Veterans Administration Hospital employment ==
After earning her nursing license, Harper began working as a registered nurse at the Tuskegee Veterans Administration Hospital. She spent over thirty years working with the Department of Veterans Affairs over her career. She moved every few years to a new hospital under the Veterans Affairs headquarters. In total, Harper moved nine times. In 1952, Harper became the nursing director at the VA in Tuskegee. Through these years as a bedside nurse, she cared for patients with chronic, debilitating mental illnesses. She developed hospital wide initiatives to engage family members in patient care and normalize patient admission stays by allowing street clothing, diet adjustments and altered medication regimens. Harper later worked at VA hospitals in Michigan, New York, Ohio, and Missouri conducting clinical research and educating staff about treatment program improvements.

== Family life ==
In 1943, Mary Starke Harper married Willie F. Harper at the age of 24. They had one daughter, Billye Louise Harper, in 1944. As Harper moved to different cities as a result of her research, she prioritized her family. She had two requirements for the moves: that her husband be offered a job comparable to the one he would be leaving and that the time frame coincided with the end of her daughter's school year. Her husband, Willie, died in 1963 and her daughter, Billye, also died in 1969 at the age of 25. Later, Harper's sister died and from 1972 to 1998, Harper moved to Washington, DC to raise her sister's three sons and care for her elderly mother.

== Geriatric psychiatric research and accomplishments ==
Harper began her clinical research career learning about the elderly population. She was a member of several professional organizations including the American Psychological Association and the Society of Clinical Geropsychology. In 1982, she attended the World Assembly on Aging in Vienna and presented her research on long-term care for the elderly. She found that often, elderly patients had mental illnesses that went undiagnosed. These patients were at risk for being improperly treated in institutional homes. Harper noted that overmedication and drug interactions posed significant problems for this population. In 2003, she shifted the focus of her research to caregiver burden. Even though family members provided 90% of long-term care for elderly patients, Harper realized there was no organized system in place to support those families.

As an African American nurse, Harper was a pioneer researcher investigating health disparities within racial and ethnic minorities and exposing the failures of the health system. Tuskegee University developed an endowed chair in geropsychiatric nursing in Harper's name. Additionally, in 2001, hospital administration in Tuscaloosa, Alabama named the Mary Starke Harper Geriatric Psychiatric Center in her honor. This hospital contained 126 beds to care for the mentally ill elderly population.

== National Institute of Mental Health Minority Fellowship Program ==
After working as a clinical nurse, Harper joined the National Institute of Mental Health (NIMH) in 1972. Over the following years, she earned a senior position. With the NIMH, Harper established research and development centers throughout the country dedicated to mental health research and improvement. She organized the NIH Minority Fellowship Program in 1972. Harper claimed her primary reason for implementing the fellowship program was her involvement in the Tuskegee project. Since its development in the 1970s, the program has educated over 12,000 doctors, scientists, nurses, psychologists, social workers and other health professionals.

== Health policy involvement ==
Harper worked 28 years for the US Department of Health and Human Services. With her knowledge of mental health and aging, she served as a consultant in all 50 states of the US, most US territories, and 21 countries. She served on White House advisory panels during four presidential administrations: Clinton, Reagan, Bush and Carter. In these roles, she consulted with the National Institute of Health (NIH), the National Mental Health Association, Johnson & Johnson drug manufacturers, and the Rosalynn Carter Institute for Caregiving, among others. From 1979 to 1981, during President Carter's administration, Harper was the director of the Office of Policy Development and Research for White House Conference on Aging. At this time, she was the first woman to hold this title. She continued to serve as director through Reagan and Bush's presidencies. When President Clinton came into office, Harper was instrumental in the development of the Clinton Mental Health and Public Sector Task Force for Health Care Reform. In 1995, she served as a consultant for the White House Conference on Aging.

== Research ==
Mary Starke Harper's research focused on geriatric and psychiatric nursing. She studied depression, delirium, Alzheimer's, suicide, and overmedication in the elderly. Harper noticed that elderly patients were often over-prescribed medications and this impacted their health both clinically and socially. She also studied the elderly population living alone and how chronic diseases impact lifestyles. Within the psychiatric research scope, Harper focused on mental health, substance abuse, schizophrenia, and healthcare in prisons. Additionally she studied recidivism within these populations. Harper recognized that patients returning to the hospital for multiple admissions were a failure on behalf of the health system and treatment plan. A hallmark of her research was incorporating family members into the treatment plan. She also studied minorities in healthcare and ethical issues surrounding disparities in minority populations.

== Publications ==
Harper wrote more than 180 journal articles and five books with regards to her research. The bulk of her publications occurred between 1972 and 1988. Her papers are stored at the University of Pennsylvania

== Awards and honors ==
Mary Starke Harper earned numerous awards in her time as nurse and researcher. The Tuskegee Institute recognized Harper as Best All Around Nurse, Scholastically and Clinically. In 1963, she earned the Federal Nursing Service Award from the Association of Military Surgeons of the US. The Veterans Affairs awarded Harper the Surgeon General's Medal of Honor twice for her patient advocacy. In 1966, Harper was inducted into Chi Eta Phi sorority and recognized for her outstanding achievements. In 1970, the Tuskegee Institute selected Harper to receive the Alumni Merit Award. In 2001, Harper won the Living Legacy Award in Aging from the American Academy of Nursing. At the ANA convention, she received the Mary Mahoney Award which commended a nurse who advanced equal opportunities for minority groups.

== Later years ==
Mary Starke Harper lived in Washington, D.C. until 1998 before moving back to Columbus, Georgia. She died of cancer on July 27, 2006. She was 86 years old. Her papers can be found at the Barbara Bates Center for the Study of the History of Nursing at the University of Pennsylvania.
