= Lula Warlick =

American nurse

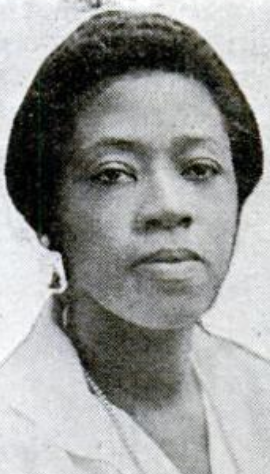
- Lula Warlick, from a 1927 publication
- Born: December 12, 1884; Lincolnton, North Carolina, U.S.
- Died: July 21, 1957 (age 72); Philadelphia, Pennsylvania, U.S.
- Occupations: Nurse, educator, nursing administrator

Lula Gertrude Warlick (December 12, 1884 – July 21, 1957) was an American nurse, educator, and nursing administrator, based in Philadelphia for much of her career.

== Early life and education ==
Lula Warlick was born in Lincolnton, North Carolina, the daughter of Eliza Ann Jackson. She trained as a teacher at Scotia Seminary, graduating in 1907. In 1910, she graduated from Lincoln Hospital School for Nurses in New York, with further studies in a summer program at the University of Iowa in 1925.

== Career ==
Warlick worked at Provident Hospital in Chicago from 1911 to 1917, and at Kansas City's Old General Hospital from 1917 to 1920. She also taught health and hygiene classes in Kansas City schools from 1924 to 1926, and trained Black women as nurses' aides during World War I.

Warlick became superintendent of nurses at Mercy Hospital in Philadelphia in 1920. She also taught in the hospital's school of nursing, and organized community outreach programs. She was active in the National Association of Colored Graduate Nurses; she spoke at the association's annual conference in 1931, and another paper by Warlick was read at conference in St. Louis in 1937. She attended the National Organization for Public Health Nursing conference in Chicago in 1942.

Warlick retired from nursing in 1943. She was honored in 1954, with a banquet in Philadelphia sponsored by the Chi Eta Phi nursing sorority.

== Publications ==
- "New Nurses' Home of Mercy Hospital and School for Nurses" (1930)

== Personal life ==
Warlick died in 1957, at the age of 72. in Philadelphia.
