= Lul =

Lul or LUL may refer to:

- Lul, village in South Sudan.
- LUL (symbol), an emote on twitch featuring a picture of video game reviewer TotalBiscuit
- Lambda Upsilon Lambda, an American fraternity
- Leiden University Library, a Dutch university library
- London Underground Limited, operator of the London Underground
- Olu’bo language (ISO 639-3 code)
- Hesler-Noble Field (IATA code)

== People with the given name Lul ==
- Lul Krag (1878–1956), a Norwegian painter
- Ras Lul Seged (died 1916), an Ethiopian military leader

== See also ==
- Lull (disambiguation)
- Lol (disambiguation)
- Lula (disambiguation)
- Lule (disambiguation)
- Lulism
- Lullism
- Lullus
- Ramon Llull
