= Lulu Town =

Former human settlement on Navassa Island

Coordinates: 18.396°N 75.0182°W

Location of Lulu Town in Navassa Island

Lulu Town, also known as Lulu Ville, is a now uninhabited, former settlement on Navassa Island, claimed by both the United States and neighbouring Haiti, in the Windward Passage.

== Overview ==
Navassa Island was claimed for the United States on September 19, 1857, by Peter Duncan, an American sea captain, under the Guano Islands Act of August 18, 1856. The modest settlement was created to house both mine workers and supervisors whose goal was the rich deposits of guano found on Navassa. This resource, gathered mainly from the interior of the island, was stored in Lulu Town for later shipment to the United States.

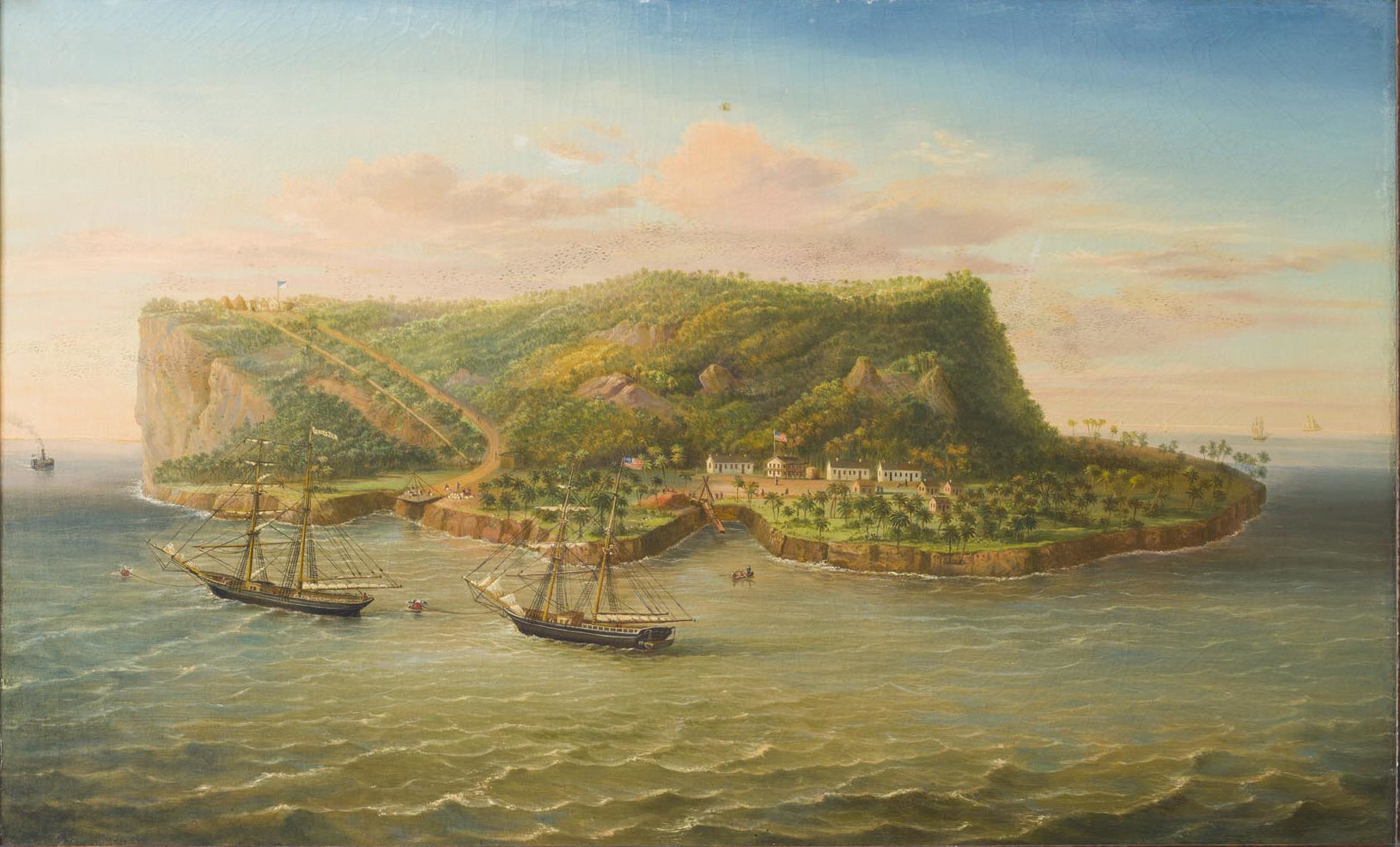
An unsigned painting of Navassa Island c. 1870 showing the brig Romance, company buildings at Lulu Town near the shore, and guano mining activity up the hillside.

Mining operations on Navassa Island were halted and the island evacuated in 1899 during the Spanish–American War. In 1901 the Navassa Phosphate Co. filed for bankruptcy and abandoned Lulu Town and rest of the island.

The town lies on Lulu Bay. Its ruggedness prevents boats from landing; such small boats as regularly ply the area are mainly fishing boats from nearby Haiti.
