= Teresa Morrissey =

Australian soccer player (born 2000)

Personal information
- Full name: Teresa Josephine Morrissey
- Date of birth: 16 May 2000 (age 26)
- Place of birth: Clayton, Victoria, Australia
- Height: 1.78 m (5 ft 10 in)
- Position: Goalkeeper

Team information
- Current team: Perth Glory
- Number: 1

Youth career
- 2005–2012: Brighton SC
- 2012–2013: FFV NTC
- 2014: Sandringham SC
- 2015–2018: FFV NTC

College career
Years	Team	Apps	(Gls)
2019–2021	Rhode Island Rams		(0)

Senior career*
Years	Team	Apps	(Gls)
2018–2019	Melbourne Victory	0	(0)
2022–2023	Alamein FC		(0)
2022–2024	Western Sydney Wanderers	0	(0)
2023–2024	Macarthur Rams		(0)
2024–2025	Central Coast Mariners	0	(0)
2025	Box Hill United	7	(0)
2025–	Perth Glory	14	(0)

International career^{‡}
2018–2019	Australia U19	1	(0)
- * Club domestic league appearances and goals as of 17 October 2026 ‡ National team caps and goals as of 17 October 2026

Teresa Josephine Morrissey (born 16 May 2000) is an Australian soccer player who plays as a goalkeeper for A-League Women club Perth Glory.

Beginning her career at A-League Women club Melbourne Victory, she went to play university soccer for Rhode Island Rams before returning to play for Western Sydney Wanderers (WSW). She later had a stint at Central Coast Mariners before becoming the starting goalkeeper at Perth Glory. Internationally, she represented Australia at under-19 level, earning one cap in 2018.

== Early life ==
Morrissey was born on 16 May 2000 in Clayton, a suburb in Melbourne, Victoria, Australia. Her mother's name is Nancy while her father's name is James, and she has three older brothers named Michael, Tony and James.

Growing up, Morrissey played soccer alongside basketball (playing for the Bentleigh Lakers for eight years) tennis. She began playing youth soccer at Brighton SC, where she played for seven years from 2005 (aged five) to 2012 (aged 12). She signed for Football Federation Victoria National Training Centre (FFV NTC) in 2012, before briefly playing for Sandringham SC in 2014 at the age of 14 and then moving back in 2015 at the age of 15. That year, she was called up to train with Melbourne Victory's W-League team. With FFV NTC, she won two state championships in 2015 and 2017 as captain, and was named Goalkeeper of the Year in the Women's Victorian Premier League (WVPL) for the 2015 season.

Morrissey attended McKinnon Secondary College (MSC), a public high school in the Melbourne suburb of McKinnon. At the school, she was a deputy sports captain and a member of the McKinnon Sports Leadership Association (MSLA). She won the school's Excellence in Sports Award in 2015 and 2018.

== College career ==
=== Rhode Island Rams ===
In 2019, Morrissey moved to the United States to study at the University of Rhode Island, a public land-grant research university in Kingston, Rhode Island. She majored in dietetics with the aim of becoming a nutritionist. Whilst at university, she played college soccer for Rhode Island Rams in the NCAA Division I. In 2019, her freshwoman year, she was named by the New England Women's Intercollegiate Soccer Association (NEWISA) in their All-New England Third Team, the lowest of the three All-New England Teams. After another season at the team in 2020, her sophomore year, she returned home to Australia in 2021, which would have been her junior year.

== Club career ==
=== Melbourne Victory ===
Morrissey began her senior career at W-League club Melbourne Victory, signing for the 2018–19 season. She made zero appearances and left at the end of the season.

=== Alamein FC ===
Upon returning to Australia, Morrissey signed for National Premier Leagues Victoria Women (NPL Victoria Women) club Alamein FC for the 2022 season.

Morrissey returned to the club for the start of the 2023 season before leaving midseason.

=== Western Sydney Wanderers ===
Morrissey returned to the newly-rebranded A-League Women in the 2022–23 season, signing for Western Sydney Wanderers (WSW). However, she again received no game time and left at the end of the 2023–24 season.

=== Macarthur Rams ===
During the 2024 season, Morrissey signed for National Premier Leagues NSW Women's (NPL NSW Women's) club Macarthur Rams. That season, she was named Goalkeeper of the Year at the annual end-of-season awards ceremony, the Football NSW Gala.

=== Central Coast Mariners ===
Morrissey had a third stint in the A-League Women in the 2024–25 season, signing for Central Coast Mariners (CCM). She was part of the CCM side that won a historic first championship after defeating her former club Melbourne Victory 5–4 on penalties after a 1–1 draw after extra time in the grand final on 18 May 2025 at Melbourne Rectangular Stadium in the central business district (CBD) of Melbourne, Victoria, leading to what was regarded one of the greatest upsets in the history of the league as they claimed their first ever title after winning the first ever grand final penalty shootout. Despite this, she once again made zero appearances and left the club at the end of the season.

=== Box Hill United ===
Morrissey signed for NPL Victoria Women's club Box Hill United for the 2025 season. She was part of the side that claimed their 10th championship, defeating Heidelberg United 2–1 in the grand final at The Home of the Matildas in Bundoora, Melbourne on 13 September 2025. She finished the season with three clean sheets in seven appearances, with a save percentage of 78.3%.

=== Perth Glory ===
Morrissey signed for her fourth A-League Women club ahead of the 2025–26 season, signing for Perth Glory. She kept a clean sheet on her A-League Women début on 12 December 2025, playing the entirety of a 1–0 victory over rivals Wellington Phoenix in the Distance Derby at home at Sam Kerr Football Centre in Queens Park, Perth, Western Australia. For the first time in her A-League Women career, she was named Player of the Month for January 2026. Becoming the club's starting goalkeeper that season, she finished the season with six clean sheets in 14 appearances and a save percentage of 83.3%. At the Most Glorious Players Awards (MGP Awards; the club's award ceremony), she was named both Members' Player of the Year (MPOTY) and Players' Player of the Year (PPOTY) for the women's team, while at the Julie Dolan Awards (the league's end-of-season awards ceremony) she was nominated for Fan Player of the Year (FPOTY) and Save of the Year, with the Save of the Year nomination coming from a save against her former club CCM in a 0–0 draw at home. She was also named by the Professional Footballers Australia (PFA) in the PFA A-League Women Team of the Season (PFA ALW TOTS).

Ahead of the 2026–27 season, Morrissey was one of 14 players who extended their contracts with Perth Glory for another season.

== International career ==
=== Australia U19 ===
Morrissey received her first international call-up when she was selected for the Australia under-19 national team by coach Gary van Egmond as part of a 23-player squad for the 2019 AFC U-19 Women's Championship qualification first round, held at Jounieh Municipal Stadium in Jounieh, Lebanon. She made her only appearance on 24 October 2018 in an 18–0 victory over Mongolia, in which she kept a clean sheet. She was an unused substitute in the remaining games and was not called up for the second round at Mandalarthiri Stadium in Mandalay, Myanmar. She was selected as part of the 23-player squad for the tournament proper in Thailand from 27 October to 9 November 2019, in which Australia finished fourth, but she did not make any appearances.

== Career statistics ==
=== College ===
Appearances and goals by college team and year
College team	Division	Year	Apps	Goals
Rhode Island Rams	NCAA Division I	2019	14	0
Rhode Island Rams	NCAA Division I	2020	7	0
Career total			21	0

=== Club ===
Appearances and goals by club, season and competition
Club	Season	League			Total	
Club	Season	Division	Apps	Goals	Apps	Goals
Melbourne Victory	2018–19	W-League	0	0	0	0
Melbourne Victory	Total		0	0	0	0
Alamein FC	2022	NPL Victoria Women	?	0	?	0
Alamein FC	Total		?	0	?	0
Western Sydney Wanderers	2022–23	A-League Women	0	0	0	0
Western Sydney Wanderers	Total		0	0	0	0
Macarthur Rams	2023	NPL NSW Women's	?	0	?	0
Macarthur Rams	Total		?	0	?	0
Western Sydney Wanderers	2023–24	A-League Women	0	0	0	0
Western Sydney Wanderers	Total		0	0	0	0
Macarthur Rams	2024	NPL NSW Women's	?	0	?	0
Macarthur Rams	Total		?	0	?	0
Central Coast Mariners	2024–25	A-League Women	0	0	0	0
Central Coast Mariners	Total		0	0	0	0
Box Hill United	2025	NPL Victoria Women	7	0	7	0
Box Hill United	Total		7	0	7	0
Perth Glory	2025–26	A-League Women	14	0	14	0
Perth Glory	2026–27	A-League Women	0	0	0	0
Perth Glory	Total		14	0	14	0
Career total			21+	0	21+	0

=== International ===
Appearances and goals by national team and year
National team	Year	Apps	Goals
Australia U19	2018	1	0
Australia U19	2019	0	0
Career total		1	0

== Honours ==
Central Coast Mariners

- A-League Women

Champions: 2024–25

Box Hill United

- National Premier Leagues Victoria Women's

Champions: 2025

Individual

- VWPL Goalkeeper of the Year: 2015
- NPLW NSW Goalkeeper of the Year: 2024
- Perth Glory Women's Members' Player of the Year: 2025–26
- Perth Glory Women's Players' Player of the Year: 2025–26
- PFA A-League Women Team of the Season: 2025–26

== Legal issues ==
At around 7:00pm Australian Eastern Standard Time (AEST) on 9 April 2023, Morrissey was escorted out of Manly Wharf Bar, a pub located in the suburb of Manly in Sydney, New South Wales (NSW), Australia, for being drunk, which she claimed at the time she was not. This led her to bite a security guard's middle finger, drawing blood, as well as a female pub staffer's wrist as she was escorted out the door. She also caused $1,000 Australian dollars in damage after throwing a drink at the security guard and pulling a metal door frame from the wall whilst screaming "uncontrollably". She claimed her alcohol addiction stems from trauma while she was under a period of stress. On 17 May 2023, she apologised and pleaded guilty in court at the Manly Local Court, where she was convicted on one count each of assault occasioning actual bodily harm (AOABH), assaulting a police officer, common assault, destroying or damaging property and failure to leave a premises when required. She later appealed these convictions after being placed on bail provided she remained on good behaviour and abstained from alcohol and illicit drugs, in which she was successful upon her sentencing on 15 December 2023.

Before 10:00pm AEST on 21 August 2024, Morrissey was again arrested after she was caught speeding in a black Toyota Corolla at 78 kilometres an hour in a 60-kilometre zone whilst on a suspended drivers' licence in the Sydney suburb of Narellan. She then tested positive for cannabis, which she claimed she had smoked four days prior after being prescribed it for chronic pain. According to the Wyong Local Court in Wyong on the NSW Central Coast, this was her second time fronting court for drug driving. On 10 March 2025, she was disqualified from driving for six months and fined $650 by the court. On 2 September 2025, Football Australia handed her a three-match suspension after using a banned substance (tetrahydrocannabinol), while she was fined $361.20 (half of her weekly salary) by her club, Central Coast Mariners (CCM).

== Personal life ==
Morrissey is a supporter of Spanish football club Barcelona, with Spanish former Barcelona winger Pedro Rodríguez being her favourite athlete.

Outside soccer, Morrissey's interests include playing basketball, listening to music and eating food.
