= 2026–27 Perth Glory FC (women) season =

19th season in existence of Perth Glory FC (women)

Perth Glory FC (women)
2026–27 season
- Head Coach: Stephen Peters
- Stadium: Sam Kerr Football Centre; HBF Park
- A-League Women: TBD
- Top goalscorer: Rola Badawiya (2)
Home colours	Away colours

The 2026–27 season is the Perth Glory Football Club (women)'s 19th season in the A-League Women.

== Players ==
=== First-team squad ===
As of 21 October 2026

Note: Flags indicate national team as defined under FIFA eligibility rules; some limited exceptions apply. Players may hold more than one non-FIFA nationality.

No.	Pos.	Nation	Player
1	GK	AUS	Teresa Morrissey
2	DF	AUS	Mischa Anderson
3	DF	AUS	Ella Buchanan
4	MF	AUS	Daisy McAllister
5	DF	AUS	Baxter Thew
6	MF	PHI	Emma Tovar
7	MF	WAL	Megan Wynne
8	MF	AUS	Georgia Cassidy
9	FW	NZL	Maggie Jenkins
10	MF	AUS	Susan Phonsongkham
11	MF	AUS	Ella Abdul-Massih
12	FW	AUS	Bronte Trew
14	MF	AUS	Charli Wainwright

No.	Pos.	Nation	Player
16	MF	AUS	Olivia Wood
17	FW	USA	Rola Badawiya
18	FW	AUS	Theodora Mouithys (youth development)
19	MF	AUS	Clancy Westaway
20	DF	AUS	Sakura Leong (scholarship)
21	GK	AUS	Alyssa Dall'Oste
22	DF	AUS	Hayley Muir (youth development)
23	MF	AUS	Isobel Dalton (captain)
24	DF	AUS	Julia Sardo
25	FW	AUS	Ella Lincoln
26	DF	AUS	Chloe Murray (scholarship)
29	DF	NGR	Onyinyechi Zogg
30	GK	AUS	Daisy McGreadie-Cole (youth development)

== Transfers ==
=== Transfers in ===
No.	Position	Player	From	Type/fee	Contract length	Date	Ref
9	FW	(New Zealand) Maggie Jenkins	(Australia) Essendon Royals	Free transfer	1 year	4 August 2026	
3	DF	Ella Buchanan	Unattached	Free transfer	1 year	6 August 2026	
21	GK	Alyssa Dall'Oste	Unattached	Free transfer	1 year	1 September 2026	
5	DF	Baxter Thew	Central Coast Mariners	Free transfer	1 year	4 September 2026	
20	DF	Sakura Leong	Unattached	Scholarship	1 year	8 September 2026	
30	GK	Daisy McGreadie-Cole	(Australia) Football West NTC	Youth development agreement	1 year	23 September 2026	
18	FW	Theodora Mouithys	(Australia) Football West NTC	Youth development agreement	1 year	23 September 2026	
22	DF	Hayley Muir	Western Sydney Wanderers Academy	Youth development agreement	1 year	23 September 2026	
26	DF	Chloe Murray	(Australia) Queensland Academy of Sport	Scholarship		21 October 2026	

=== Transfers out ===
No.	Position	Player	Transferred to	Type/fee	Date	Ref
9	FW	(United States) Gabby Hollar	Unattached	End of contract	4 June 2026	
11	DF	Natalie Tathem	Unattached	End of contract	4 June 2026	
13	DF	Naomi Chinnama	Unattached	End of contract	4 June 2026	
19	MF	Sarah O'Donoghue	Unattached	End of contract	4 June 2026	
22	MF	Ischia Brooking	Unattached	End of contract	4 June 2026	
26	FW	Tanika Lala	Unattached	End of contract	4 June 2026	
6	DF	Tijan McKenna	(Norway) Vålerenga	End of contract	17 July 2026	
5	DF	Grace Johnston	(England) Charlton Athletic	End of contract	18 July 2026	
21	GK	Meg Phillips	Unattached	End of contract	16 October 2026	
30	GK	Jessica Skinner	Unattached	End of contract	16 October 2026	
52	GK	Dayle Schroeder	Unattached	End of contract	16 October 2026	

=== Contract extensions ===
No.	Player	Position	Duration	Date	Ref.
1	Teresa Morrissey	Goalkeeper	1 year	31 July 2026	
2	Mischa Anderson	Defender	1 year	31 July 2026	
3	(Philippines) Emma Tovar	Midfielder	1 year	31 July 2026	
4	Daisy McAllister	Midfielder	1 year	31 July 2026	
7	(Wales) Megan Wynne	Winger	1 year	31 July 2026	
10	Susan Phonsongkham	Midfielder	1 year	31 July 2026	
12	Bronte Trew	Forward	1 year	31 July 2026	
16	Olivia Wood	Midfielder	1 year	31 July 2026	
20	Ella Abdul-Massih	Midfielder	1 year	31 July 2026	
23	Isobel Dalton	Midfielder	1 year	31 July 2026	
24	Julia Sardo	Defender	1 year	31 July 2026	
25	Ella Lincoln	Forward	1 year	31 July 2026	
14	Charli Wainwright	Midfielder	1 year	31 July 2026	
19	Clancy Westaway	Midfielder	1 year	31 July 2026	

== Pre-season and friendlies ==
10 October 2026 Challenge Cup	WA State Team (Western Australia)	2–4	Perth Glory	Perth
17:00 AWST	Doeglas 24'; Flannery 54'	Report	Thew 12'; Abdul-Massih 16'; Lincoln 28', 50'	Stadium: Kingsway Reserve; Referee: Jess Byrd

== Competitions ==
=== Overall record ===
Competition	First match	Last match	Record							
Competition	First match	Last match	Pld	W	D	L	GF	GA	GD	Win %
A-League Women	17 October 2026	TBD	6	3	2	1	4	1	+3	50.00
Total			6	3	2	1	4	1	+3	50.00

Last updated: 22 November 2026
Source: Competitions

=== A-League Women ===
==== League table ====
Pos	Team	Pld	W	D	L	GF	GA	GD	Pts	Qualification
1	Perth Glory	6	3	2	1	4	1	+3	11	Qualification for AFC Women's Champions League and Finals series
2	Central Coast Mariners	5	3	1	1	12	5	+7	10	Qualification for Finals series
3	Wellington Phoenix (Note: Wellington Phoenix cannot qualify for the AFC Women's Champions League as they are based in New Zealand, which is part of the Oceania Football Confederation.)	6	3	1	2	9	6	+3	10	Qualification for Finals series
4	Melbourne Victory	6	2	3	1	4	4	0	9	Qualification for Finals series
5	Canberra United	5	3	0	2	6	8	−2	9	Qualification for Finals series

Updated to match(es) played on 22 November 2026. Source: A-Leagues
Rules for classification: 1) points; 2) goal difference; 3) goals scored; 4) wins; 5) head-to-head results; 5a) head-to-head points; 5b) head-to-head goal difference; 6) Fair Play points; 7) away goal difference; 8) away goals per match; 9) home goal difference; 10) home goals per match; 11) toss of a coin in an event of a tie of two clubs.

==== Results summary ====
Overall								Home						Away					
Pld	W	D	L	GF	GA	GD	Pts	W	D	L	GF	GA	GD	W	D	L	GF	GA	GD
6	3	2	1	4	1	+3	11	1	0	1	2	1	+1	2	2	0	2	0	+2

Last updated: 22 November 2026.
Source: A-Leagues

==== Results by round ====
Round	1	2	3	4	5	6	7	8	9	10	11	12	13	14	15	16	17	18	19	20	21	22
Ground	A	A	H	H	A	A	H	H	A	B	H	A	H	H	A	H	H	B	A	A	H	A
Result	W	D	W	L	W	D				B								B				
Position	4	4	2	2	2	1																
Points	3	4	7	7	10	11																

Updated to match(es) played on 22 November 2026. Source: A-Leagues
A = Away; H = Home; B = Bye; W = Win; D = Draw; L = Loss; P = Postponed

==== Matches ====
The league fixtures were released on 21 August 2026.

Win Draw Loss Fixtures

17 October 2026 1	Newcastle Jets	0–1	Perth Glory	Weston
15:00 AEDT		Report	Badawiya 13' (pen.)	Stadium: Hunter City Motor Group Stadium; Referee: Caitlin Williams

24 October 2026 2	Adelaide United	0–0	Perth Glory	Adelaide
16:30 ACDT		Report		Stadium: Service FM Stadium; Referee: Caitlin Williams

1 November 2026 3	Perth Glory	2–0	Wellington Phoenix	Perth
18:45 AWST	Tovar 5'; Badawiya 40'	Report		Stadium: HBF Park; Referee: Mikayla Ryan

7 November 2026 4	Perth Glory	0–1	Canberra United	Perth
16:00 AEST		Report	Condon 55'	Stadium: HBF Park

14 November 2026 5	Central Coast Mariners	0–1	Perth Glory	Gosford
17:00 AEDT		Report	Jenkins 78'	Stadium: polytec Stadium; Referee: Isabella Mossin

22 November 2026 6	Melbourne Victory	0–0	Perth Glory	Melbourne
14:00 AEDT		Report		Stadium: The Home of the Matildas; Referee: Isabella Mossin

12 December 2026 7	Perth Glory	v	Melbourne City	Perth
17:00 AWST		Report		Stadium: Sam Kerr Football Centre

19 December 2026 8	Perth Glory	v	Western Sydney Wanderers	Perth
17:00 AWST		Report		Stadium: Sam Kerr Football Centre

30 December 2026 9	Brisbane Roar	v	Perth Glory	Brisbane
15:50 AEST		Report		Stadium: Kayo Stadium

10 January 2027 11	Perth Glory	v	Sydney FC	Perth
17:00 AWST		Report		Stadium: Sam Kerr Football Centre

16 January 2027 12	Wellington Phoenix FC	v	Perth Glory	Wellington
17:00 NZDT		Report		Stadium: Porirua Park

23 January 2027 13	Perth Glory	v	Adelaide United	Perth
17:00 AWST		Report		Stadium: Sam Kerr Football Centre

30 January 2027 14	Perth Glory	v	Newcastle Jets	Perth
17:00 AWST		Report		Stadium: Sam Kerr Football Centre

7 February 2027 15	Melbourne City	v	Perth Glory	Melbourne
17:00 AEDT		Report		Stadium: ctrl:cyber Pitch

13 February 2027 16	Perth Glory	v	Brisbane Roar	Perth
17:00 AWST		Report		Stadium: Sam Kerr Football Centre

21 February 2027 17	Perth Glory	v	Central Coast Mariners	Perth
17:00 AWST		Report		Stadium: Sam Kerr Football Centre

20 March 2027 19	Western Sydney Wanderers	v	Perth Glory	Sydney
14:15 AEDT		Report		Stadium: TBC

27 March 2027 20	Sydney FC	v	Perth Glory	Wollongong
17:00 AEDT		Report		Stadium: WIN Stadium

4 April 2027 21	Perth Glory	v	Melbourne Victory	Perth
17:00 AWST		Report		Stadium: Sam Kerr Football Centre

10 April 2027 22	Canberra United	v	Perth Glory	Canberra
15:00 AEST		Report		Stadium: McKellar Park

== Statistics ==
=== Appearances and goals ===
Players with no appearances are not included in the list.

As of match played 22 November 2026

No.	Pos	Nat	Player	Total		A-League Women	
No.	Pos	Nat	Player	Apps	Goals	Apps	Goals
2	DF	(Australia) AUS	Mischa Anderson	3	0	0+3	0
3	DF	(Australia) AUS	Ella Buchanan	6	0	6	0
5	DF	(Australia) AUS	Baxter Thew	6	0	6	0
6	MF	(Philippines) PHI	Emma Tovar	6	1	6	1
7	MF	(Wales) WAL	Megan Wynne	4	0	0+4	0
8	MF	(Australia) AUS	Georgia Cassidy	6	0	6	0
9	FW	(New Zealand) NZL	Maggie Jenkins	6	1	5+1	1
10	FW	(Australia) AUS	Susan Phonsongkham	6	0	5+1	0
11	FW	(Australia) AUS	Ella Abdul Massih	5	0	2+3	0
12	FW	(Australia) AUS	Bronte Trew	6	0	0+6	0
14	MF	(Australia) AUS	Charli Wainwright	2	0	0+2	0
17	FW	(United States) USA	Rola Badawiya	6	2	6	2
18	FW	(Australia) AUS	Theodora Mouthis	1	0	0+1	0
19	MF	(Australia) AUS	Clancy Westaway	6	0	3+3	0
23	MF	(Australia) AUS	Isobel Dalton	4	0	2+2	0
24	DF	(Australia) AUS	Julia Sardo	6	0	6	0
25	FW	(Australia) AUS	Ella Lincoln	5	0	1+4	0
29	DF	(Nigeria) NGR	Onyinyechi Zogg	6	0	6	0
21	GK	(Australia) AUS	Alyssa Dall'Oste	6	0	6	0

- Source: Soccerway

=== Clean sheets ===
Includes all competitions.

As of 22 November 2026

Rank	No.	Nat.	Goalkeeper	A-League Women	Total
1	21	(Australia)	Alyssa Dall'Oste	5	5

== See also ==
- 2026–27 Perth Glory FC season
