= Norrah Lemongo =

Cameroonian athlete

Personal information
- Nationality: (Cameroon) Cameroonian

Norrah Frederic Lemongo Nkoulou (born August 10, 2004) is an athlete and tennis player of Cameroonian origin, who is a specialist in shot put. She won the gold medal in the shot put at the Francophone Games in August 2023.

== Biography ==
Norrah Lemongo was born on August 10, 2004, in Cameroon. She has three brothers and sisters. She completed her secondary studies at the Adventist College of Yaoundé, then university studies at the University of Pittsburgh in the United States.

She began her career as an athlete in 2020. In 2023, she won two bronze medals in the shot put and discus at the African Under-20 Athletics Championships in Zambia. In April 2024, she was named the Atlantic Coast Conference Athlete of the Week for her performance at the South Florida Invitational, where she threw 15.68 m.

In 2024, she participated in the African Athletics Championships in Douala, Cameroon.

== Achievements ==
International Achievements
Date	Competition	Venue	Result	Event	Score
2023	African Junior Championships	Lusaka	3rd	Shot	14.63 m
2023	African Junior Championships	Lusaka	3rd	Discus	38.77 m
2023	Francophone Games	Kinshasa	1st	Shot put	14.99
2024	African Athletics Championships	Douala	5th	Shot put	15.16 m
