= Women's tennis in South Africa =

Women's tennis in South Africa has historically been played primarily by English-speaking whites, with lower adoption rates by other groups of women in the country. International ties existed early with an Australian team touring in 1928. South Africa began competing in the Fed Cup during the inaugural year of the competition. From 1972 until the 1980s, there were some restrictions for South African tennis players.

== History ==
Historically, women's tennis in South Africa has been played primarily by English-speaking whites. The game was also embraced by Afrikaners, but not at the same competitive level as their English-speaking peers. Women's tennis was being played in South Africa by 1928, when a women's tennis team from Australia visited the country.

In 1963, South Africa began competing in the Fed Cup (Federation Cup) when the competition was inaugurated. The country was banned from playing in 1971, but this ban was lifted in 1972, and the International Tennis Federation moved South Africa to the Latin American region to avoid regional conflicts over its participation. South Africa won the event in 1972, when it was held in Johannesburg. However, later that year, the country was banned from competing. This ban remained in place from 1972 until the 1980s, although South African tennis players were still allowed to compete in international tournaments as individuals and members of the International Tennis Federation were allowed to play in South Africa.

During the 1980s and 1990s, some South African women's tennis players attended American universities and played for their tennis teams. As of 1987, they constituted the second largest international group recruited to play, making up an estimated 10.3% of all foreign players in Division I tennis programs. In 2001, for the first time, a white South African professional tennis player, Amanda Coetzer, partnered with a black American, Lori McNeil, to play professional doubles.

== See also ==
- Tennis South Africa

== Bibliography ==
- Archer, Robert; Bouillon, Antoine (1982). The South African Game, Sport and Racism. Africa. London: Zed Press. ISBN 0862320828.
- Djata, Sundiata (2008). Blacks at the Net: Black Achievement in the History of Tennis. Syracuse University Press. ISBN 978-0-8156-0898-1.
- Bale, John (1991). The Brawn Drain: Foreign Student-athletes in American Universities. University of Illinois Press. p. 58. ISBN 978-0-252-01732-2.
- Sherington, Geoffrey; Georgakis, Steve (2008). Sydney University Sport 1852-2007: More Than a Club. Sydney University Press. ISBN 978-1-920898-91-5.
