= Women's tennis in the United States =

Women's tennis has been played in the United States for over a century where several important and famous female tennis players originated.

== History ==
Chris Evert a dominant force in women's tennis during the 1970s and 1980s

By 1888, American women tennis players were agitating for their own championship competition. USLTA claimed that they lacked the authority to organise such a competition. In 1923, the Wightman Cup was created as a national women's tennis competition between the United States and Great Britain. The trophy for the event was paid for by Hazel Wightman, an American tennis champion. The location of the cup was alternated between countries on a yearly basis. Great Britain won in 1924, 1925, 1928 and 1930. In all other years that the cup was contested, the Americans claimed victory.

== Important players ==
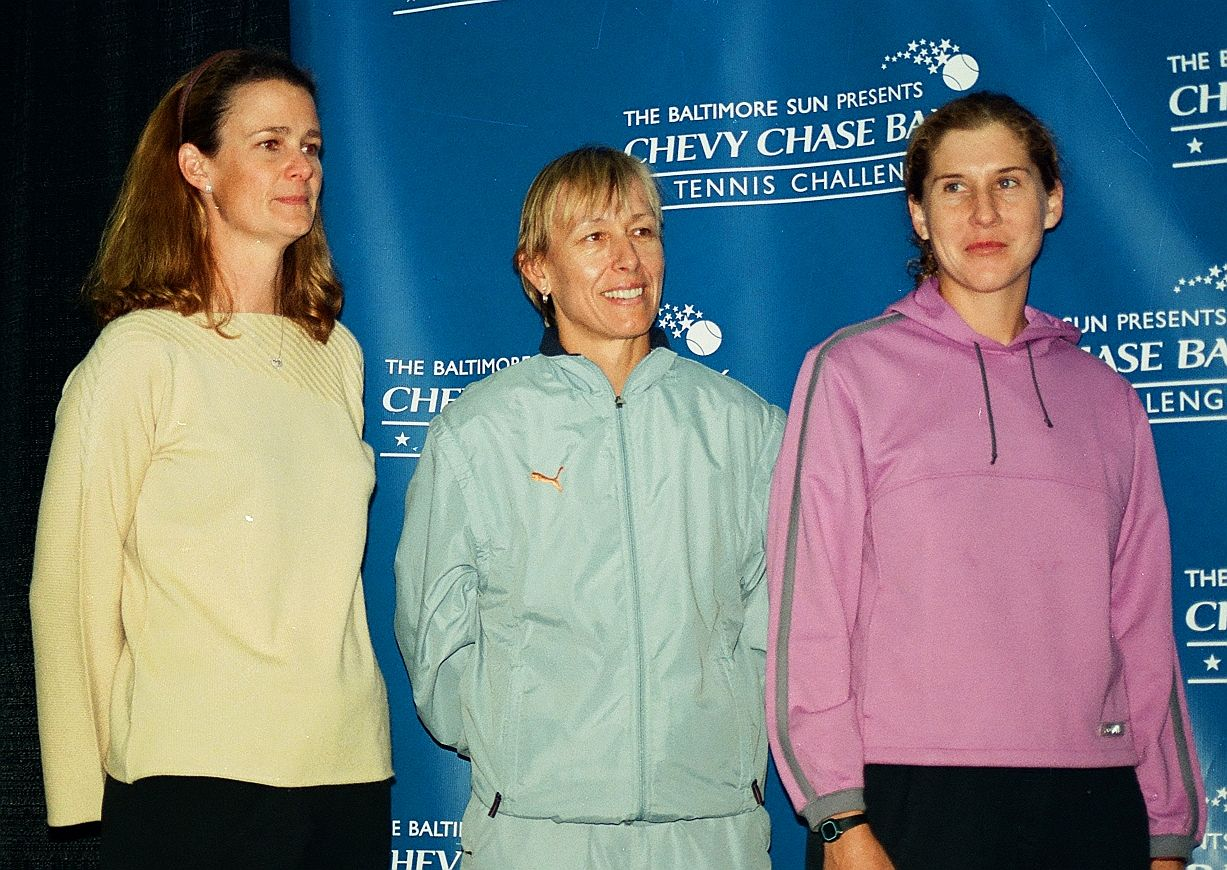
Players Pam Shriver, Martina Navratilova, and Monica Seles

Helen Wills Moody won 31 Grand Slam titles in the 1920s and 1930s. She helped to popularize the overhand serve for women during the 1940s. Alice Marble is another important influential American tennis player. In 1939, she was a triple champion at Wimbledon. Her style of play was characterized as masculine because of her aggressive pursuit of the ball during serves and volleys. Like Helen Wills Moody, others would go on to copy her style of play. Maureen Connolly won the four Grand Slam singles tournaments in 1953.

Althea Gibson was the first African American woman to win a Grand Slam tournament. She claimed the singles title at the French Championships in 1956, and at Wimbledon and the US Nationals in 1957 and 1958.

In the Open Era, the United States has produced successful players including Billie Jean King, Chris Evert, Martina Navratilova (defected from Czechoslovakia), Monica Seles (defected from Serbia and Montenegro), Venus Williams, and Serena Williams. The arrival of the Williams sisters is credited as the ushering in of a new era of power and athleticism on the women's tour and 23 time Grand Slam champion Serena Williams is considered by some to be the greatest women's player of all time.

== Bibliography ==
- Robertson, Max (1974). The Encyclopedia of Tennis, 100 Years of Great Players and Events. New York: Viking Press. ISBN 067029408X. LCCN 73010776.

== See also ==
- Tennis in the United States
- Women's tennis in Australia
- List of American tennis players at the Summer Olympics
