= Woman Series =

Woman Series may refer to:

- Woman's film
- Women's tennis competitions
- The Woman series of paintings by Willem de Kooning
