= 2019 AFC U-19 Women's Championship squads =

The following is a list of squads for each national team competing at the 2019 AFC U-19 Women's Championship. The tournament took place in Thailand, between 27 October–9 November 2019. It was the 10th U-19 age group competition organised by the Asian Football Confederation.

Players born between 1 January 2000 and 31 December 2004 are eligible to compete in the tournament. Each team had to register a squad of minimum 16 players and maximum 23 players, minimum two of whom must have been goalkeepers (Regulations Articles 24.1 and 24.2). The full squad listings are below.

== Group A ==
=== Thailand ===
Coach: Arun Tulwattanangkul

The final squad was named on 15 October 2019.

No.	Pos.	Player	Date of birth (age)	Club
1	GK	Ponpimon Ngoenphon	30 May 2002 (aged 17)	(Football Association of Thailand) Lampang
2	DF	Thadarat Thaisongtham	9 April 2002 (aged 17)	(Football Association of Thailand) Khon Kaen
3	DF	Nutnichka Kalasin	18 March 2001 (aged 18)	(Football Association of Thailand) IPE Chonburi
4	DF	Siriwipa Jantarak	19 April 2001 (aged 18)	(Football Association of Thailand) IPE Chonburi
5	DF	Tipkritta Onsamai	17 June 2000 (aged 19)	(Football Association of Thailand) BG–College of Asian Scholars
6	DF	Tamonwan Raksaphakdi	24 February 2000 (aged 19)	(Football Association of Thailand) BG–College of Asian Scholars
7	DF	Ratchaphan Kitirat	18 June 2000 (aged 19)	(Football Association of Thailand) IPE Udon Thani
8	MF	Kanchaliya Phimphabut	10 July 2000 (aged 19)	(Football Association of Thailand) BG–College of Asian Scholars
9	MF	Chatchawan Rodthong	22 June 2002 (aged 17)	(Football Association of Thailand) Wichutit School
10	MF	Thanakon Phonkham	18 February 2002 (aged 17)	(Football Association of Thailand) Chonburi
11	FW	Nadia Jehda	13 October 2000 (aged 19)	(Football Association of Thailand) Phatthalung
12	MF	Nutwadee Pram-nak	9 October 2000 (aged 19)	(Football Association of Thailand) Kasetsart University
13	MF	Porntip Thongwijit	27 June 2001 (aged 18)	(Football Association of Thailand) Wichutit School
14	DF	Phonchita Thaenprathum	4 June 2002 (aged 17)	(Football Association of Thailand) Wichutit School
15	DF	Rattikan Khamphaeng	28 September 2001 (aged 18)	(Football Association of Thailand) Nakhon Sawan
16	DF	Ploychompoo Somnuek	26 December 2002 (aged 16)	(Football Association of Thailand) Khon Kaen
17	FW	Pariyapat Kakkaew	4 April 2000 (aged 19)	(Football Association of Thailand) IPE Chonburi
18	GK	Wararat Nanongtum	19 August 2001 (aged 18)	(Football Association of Thailand) Na Luang School
19	FW	Jirapaporn Damhai	7 November 2001 (aged 17)	(Football Association of Thailand) Nakhon Si Thammarat
20	MF	Aritsara Wichai	3 April 2003 (aged 16)	(Football Association of Thailand) Khon Kaen
21	FW	Pattaranan Aupachai	9 July 2002 (aged 17)	(Football Association of Thailand) Lampang
22	GK	Kanyanee Tawinwong	15 September 2000 (aged 19)	(Football Association of Thailand) Thonburi University
23	MF	Pornnapa Ounsa	19 May 2001 (aged 18)	(Football Association of Thailand) Khon Kaen

=== North Korea ===
Coach: Song Sung-gwon

No.	Pos.	Player	Date of birth (age)	Club
1	GK	Yun Pyol	4 January 2002 (aged 17)	(DPR Korea Football Association) Naegohyang SC
2	MF	Ri Ye-yong	10 April 2001 (aged 18)	(DPR Korea Football Association) North Pyongan
3	DF	Ri Kum-hyang	22 April 2001 (aged 18)	(DPR Korea Football Association) Naegohyang SC
4	DF	Kim Ryu-song	26 February 2002 (aged 17)	(DPR Korea Football Association) Naegohyang SC
5	DF	Son Ok-ju	7 March 2000 (aged 19)	(DPR Korea Football Association) Pyongyang City
6	MF	Ri Su-jong	5 July 2002 (aged 17)	(DPR Korea Football Association) Naegohyang SC
7	MF	Ri Su-gyong	14 April 2003 (aged 16)	(DPR Korea Football Association) Naegohyang SC
8	DF	Ryu Sol-song	27 February 2002 (aged 17)	(DPR Korea Football Association) Naegohyang SC
9	MF	Pang Un-sim	29 June 2001 (aged 18)	(DPR Korea Football Association) Naegohyang SC
10	MF	Choe Kum-ok	23 February 2002 (aged 17)	(DPR Korea Football Association) Naegohyang SC
11	MF	O Si-nae	14 January 2001 (aged 18)	(DPR Korea Football Association) Naegohyang SC
12	FW	Pak Hyon-jong	12 June 2000 (aged 19)	(DPR Korea Football Association) Naegohyang SC
13	FW	Ri Chong-gyong	6 April 2001 (aged 18)	(DPR Korea Football Association) Pyongyang City
14	FW	Kim Yun-ok	14 March 2003 (aged 16)	(DPR Korea Football Association) Naegohyang SC
15	MF	Yun Ji-hwa	3 January 2002 (aged 17)	(DPR Korea Football Association) Sobaeksu
16	FW	Kim Hyang	8 January 2001 (aged 18)	(DPR Korea Football Association) Sobaeksu
17	MF	Kim Kyong-yong	2 January 2002 (aged 17)	(DPR Korea Football Association) Naegohyang SC
18	GK	Yu Son-gum	8 November 2003 (aged 15)	(DPR Korea Football Association) Sobaeksu
19	FW	Pak Il-gyong	18 April 2002 (aged 17)	(DPR Korea Football Association) Naegohyang SC
20	FW	Jong Yun-mi	4 February 2002 (aged 17)	(DPR Korea Football Association) April 25
21	GK	Ri Hyon-gyong	9 September 2003 (aged 16)	(DPR Korea Football Association) Naegohyang SC
22	DF	Ri Sin-ok	26 May 2003 (aged 16)	(DPR Korea Football Association) Naegohyang SC

=== Australia ===
Coach: Leah Blayney

The final squad was named on 15 October 2019.

No.	Pos.	Player	Date of birth (age)	Club
1	GK	Annalee Grove	15 June 2001 (aged 18)	(Football Australia) Brisbane Roar
2	DF	Charlotte Grant	20 September 2001 (aged 18)	(Football Australia) Adelaide United
3	DF	Chelsea Blissett	3 March 2000 (aged 19)	(Football Australia) Melbourne City
4	DF	Karly Roestbakken	17 January 2001 (aged 18)	(Football Australia) Canberra United
5	DF	Courtney Nevin	12 February 2002 (aged 17)	(Football Australia) Western Sydney Wanderers
6	FW	Mary Fowler	14 February 2003 (aged 16)	(Football Australia) Adelaide United
7	FW	Princess Ibini-Isei	31 January 2000 (aged 19)	(Football Australia) Sydney FC
8	MF	Rachel Lowe	19 November 2000 (aged 18)	(Football Australia) Western Sydney Wanderers
9	MF	Kyra Cooney-Cross	15 February 2002 (aged 17)	(Football Australia) Melbourne Victory
10	DF	Hollie Palmer	1 March 2001 (aged 18)	(Football Australia) Brisbane Roar
11	FW	Shadeene Evans	7 September 2001 (aged 18)	(Football Australia) Sydney FC
12	GK	Teresa Morrissey	16 May 2000 (aged 19)	(United States Soccer Federation) Rhode Island Rams
13	DF	Angelique Hristodoulou	17 September 2001 (aged 18)	(Football Australia) Sydney FC
14	FW	Indiah-Paige Riley	20 December 2001 (aged 17)	(Football Australia) Brisbane Roar
15	MF	Susan Phonsongkham	12 February 2001 (aged 18)	(Football Australia) Western Sydney Wanderers
16	FW	Deborah De La Harpe	5 April 2000 (aged 19)	(Football Australia) NWS Koalas
17	DF	Abbey Green	15 October 2002 (aged 17)	(Football Australia) Perth Glory
18	GK	Morgan Aquino	4 August 2001 (aged 18)	(Football Australia) Perth Glory
19	MF	Ciara Fowler	16 July 2001 (aged 18)	(Football Australia) Adelaide United
20	MF	Tessa Tamplin	3 March 2001 (aged 18)	(Football Australia) Newcastle Jets
21	MF	Aideen Keane	9 February 2002 (aged 17)	(Football Australia) FNSW Institute
22	MF	Claudia Mihocic	12 April 2003 (aged 16)	(Football Australia) NTC Victoria
23	DF	Emily Hodgson	1 July 2000 (aged 19)	(Football Australia) Adelaide United

=== Vietnam ===
Coach: (Japan) Akira Ijiri

The preliminary squad was named on 6 October 2019. The final squad was announced on 21 October 2019.

No.	Pos.	Player	Date of birth (age)	Club
1	GK	Nguyễn Thị Loan	12 February 2000 (aged 19)	(Vietnam Football Federation) TDTT Hanoi
2	DF	Nguyễn Thị Xuân Điệp	1 February 2000 (aged 19)	(Vietnam Football Federation) TDTT Hanoi
3	DF	Hoàng Thị Hiền	15 April 2000 (aged 19)	(Vietnam Football Federation) Than Khoáng Sản
4	DF	Nguyễn Minh Nhật	20 January 2001 (aged 18)	(Vietnam Football Federation) TDTT Hanoi
5	MF	Nguyễn Thị Tú Anh	4 July 2002 (aged 17)	(Vietnam Football Federation) TDTT Hanoi
6	MF	Trần Thị Hải Linh	8 June 2001 (aged 18)	(Vietnam Football Federation) TDTT Hanoi
7	MF	Nguyễn Thị Trúc Hương	4 March 2000 (aged 19)	(Vietnam Football Federation) Than Khoáng Sản
8	FW	Nguyễn Thị Tuyết Ngân	10 February 2000 (aged 19)	(Vietnam Football Federation) TDTT Ho Chi Minh
9	FW	Vũ Thị Hoa	6 November 2003 (aged 15)	(Vietnam Football Federation) TDTT Hanoi
10	FW	Châu Thị Vàng	22 April 2002 (aged 17)	(Vietnam Football Federation) Than Khoáng Sản
11	FW	Nguyễn Thị Thanh Nhã	25 September 2001 (aged 18)	(Vietnam Football Federation) TDTT Hanoi
12	DF	Trần Thị Duyên	28 December 2000 (aged 18)	(Vietnam Football Federation) TDTT Ha Nam
13	MF	Ngô Thị Hồng Nhung	6 September 2000 (aged 19)	(Vietnam Football Federation) TDTT Ho Chi Minh
14	MF	Nguyễn Ngọc Thanh Như	12 December 2000 (aged 18)	(Vietnam Football Federation) TDTT Ho Chi Minh
15	MF	Nguyễn Thị Hòa	28 November 2000 (aged 18)	(Vietnam Football Federation) TDTT Hanoi
16	FW	Ngân Thị Vạn Sự	29 April 2001 (aged 18)	(Vietnam Football Federation) TDTT Hanoi
17	MF	Nguyễn Thị Hằng	17 January 2001 (aged 18)	(Vietnam Football Federation) TDTT Hanoi
18	DF	Lương Thị Thu Thương	1 May 2000 (aged 19)	(Vietnam Football Federation) Than Khoáng Sản
19	DF	Cù Thị Huỳnh Như	7 August 2000 (aged 19)	(Vietnam Football Federation) TDTT Ho Chi Minh
20	GK	Đào Thị Kiều Oanh	25 January 2003 (aged 16)	(Vietnam Football Federation) TDTT Hanoi
21	DF	Phan Thị Thu Thìn	26 January 2001 (aged 18)	(Vietnam Football Federation) Than Khoáng Sản
22	GK	Mai Mi Mi	25 February 2000 (aged 19)	(Vietnam Football Federation) TDTT Ho Chi Minh
23	FW	Trần Thị Thương	2 January 2002 (aged 17)	(Vietnam Football Federation) TDTT Hanoi

== Group B ==
=== Japan ===
Coach: Futoshi Ikeda

The final squad was named on 3 October 2019.

No.	Pos.	Player	Date of birth (age)	Club
1	GK	Momoko Tanaka	17 March 2000 (aged 19)	(Japan Football Association) Yamato Sylphid
2	MF	Mai Watanabe	5 September 2000 (aged 19)	(Japan Football Association) Nittaidai Fields
3	DF	Wakaba Gotō	4 June 2001 (aged 18)	(Japan Football Association) Nippon TV
4	DF	Hana Takahashi	19 February 2000 (aged 19)	(Japan Football Association) Urawa Red Diamonds
5	DF	Nodoka Funaki	10 August 2000 (aged 19)	(Japan Football Association) Waseda University
6	MF	Momo Nakao	9 March 2002 (aged 17)	(Japan Football Association) JEF United Chiba
7	MF	Chise Takizawa	14 February 2001 (aged 18)	(Japan Football Association) Nagano Parceiro
8	MF	Misaki Morita	11 January 2002 (aged 17)	(Japan Football Association) Okayama Sakuyo High School
9	FW	Haruka Ōsawa	15 April 2001 (aged 18)	(Japan Football Association) JEF United Chiba
10	MF	Oto Kanno	30 October 2000 (aged 18)	(Japan Football Association) Nippon TV
11	MF	Momo Kato	28 January 2001 (aged 18)	(Japan Football Association) NGU Loveledge Nagoya
12	MF	Sara Itō	11 November 2001 (aged 17)	(Japan Football Association) Nippon TV
13	DF	Shino Matsuda	27 March 2001 (aged 18)	(Japan Football Association) Nippon TV
14	FW	Nanako Takeda	17 February 2000 (aged 19)	(Japan Football Association) Vegalta Sendai
15	DF	Chihiro Tomioka	15 August 2001 (aged 18)	(Japan Football Association) JFA Academy Fukushima LSC
16	MF	Haruka Miura	2 September 2000 (aged 19)	(Japan Football Association) Nittaidai Fields
17	FW	Maho Hirosawa	18 October 2000 (aged 19)	(Japan Football Association) Waseda University
18	GK	Maya Inō	29 September 2000 (aged 19)	(Japan Football Association) Nittaidai Fields
19	FW	Yuzuki Yamamoto	1 September 2002 (aged 17)	(Japan Football Association) Nippon TV
20	DF	Ibuki Nagae	3 March 2002 (aged 17)	(Japan Football Association) Fujieda Junshin High School
21	GK	Shu Ohba	11 July 2002 (aged 17)	(Japan Football Association) JFA Academy Fukushima LSC
22	DF	Haruna Tabata	27 May 2002 (aged 17)	(Japan Football Association) Cerezo Osaka
23	MF	Fukina Mizuno	31 January 2001 (aged 18)	(Japan Football Association) INAC Kobe Leonessa

=== China PR ===
Coach: (South Korea) Park Tae-ha

The final squad was announced on 27 October 2019.

No.	Pos.	Player	Date of birth (age)	Club
1	GK	Zhu Mengdi	25 January 2000 (aged 19)	(Chinese Football Association) Sichuan FA
2	DF	Yang Shuhui	28 October 2000 (aged 18)	(Chinese Football Association) Shanghai RCB
3	DF	Dou Jiaxing	29 February 2000 (aged 19)	(Chinese Football Association) Jiangsu Suning
4	DF	Wang Linlin	4 August 2000 (aged 19)	(Chinese Football Association) Shanghai RCB
5	DF	Si Yu	18 March 2000 (aged 19)	(Chinese Football Association) Dalian Quanjian
6	MF	Shao Shiyu	21 April 2000 (aged 19)	(Chinese Football Association) Zhejiang Lander
7	FW	Yang Qian	5 January 2001 (aged 18)	(Chinese Football Association) Shanghai RCB
8	MF	Zhou Xinyu	26 February 2002 (aged 17)	(Chinese Football Association) Jiangsu Suning
9	FW	Zhang Linyan	16 January 2001 (aged 18)	(Chinese Football Association) Beijing Phoenix
10	FW	Yao Mengjia	10 November 2000 (aged 18)	(Chinese Football Association) Beijing Phoenix
11	MF	Shen Menglu	10 May 2002 (aged 17)	(Chinese Football Association) Jiangsu Suning
12	DF	Zhuo Maji	4 October 2000 (aged 19)	(Chinese Football Association) Sichuan FA
13	DF	Chen Mengyuan	3 January 2000 (aged 19)	(Chinese Football Association) Dalian Quanjian
14	FW	Li Yinghua	28 January 2001 (aged 18)	(Chinese Football Association) Shandong Ticai
15	DF	Yuan Cong	17 April 2000 (aged 19)	(Chinese Football Association) Shandong Ticai
16	MF	Li Yingrui	5 February 2001 (aged 18)	(Chinese Football Association) Henan Huishang
17	MF	Sun Pingwei	30 October 2001 (aged 17)	(Chinese Football Association) Dalian Yifang
18	DF	Yang Xiaoxia	8 October 2000 (aged 19)	(Chinese Football Association) Shaanxi WFC
19	MF	Han Xuan	28 July 2000 (aged 19)	(Chinese Football Association) Jiangsu Suning
20	FW	Tian Yunlang	16 January 2000 (aged 19)	(Chinese Football Association) Shaanxi WFC
21	GK	Hao Yixin	19 April 2002 (aged 17)	(Chinese Football Association) Jiangsu Suning
22	GK	Wang Meixing	8 September 2001 (aged 18)	(Chinese Football Association) Dalian Yifang
23	MF	Jin Jing	12 June 2001 (aged 18)	(Chinese Football Association) Shanghai RCB

=== South Korea ===
Coach: Hur Jung-jae

The final squad was announced on 27 October 2019.

No.	Pos.	Player	Date of birth (age)	Club
1	GK	Lee Hyeon-ju	8 May 2000 (aged 19)	(Korea Football Association) University of Ulsan
2	DF	Kim Eun-soul	19 January 2000 (aged 19)	(Korea Football Association) Daeduk College
3	DF	Jo Min-ah	26 October 2000 (aged 19)	(Korea Football Association) University of Ulsan
4	DF	Jeong Yu-jin	25 December 2000 (aged 18)	(Korea Football Association) University of Ulsan
5	DF	Noh Jin-young	3 June 2000 (aged 19)	(Korea Football Association) Dankook University
6	DF	Shin Bo-mi	14 March 2000 (aged 19)	(Korea Football Association) Uiduk University
7	MF	Park Hye-jeong	30 March 2000 (aged 19)	(Korea Football Association) Korea University Sejong Campus
8	MF	Kim Soo-jin	4 February 2000 (aged 19)	(Korea Football Association) Uiduk University
9	FW	Cho Mi-jin	4 April 2001 (aged 18)	(Korea Football Association) Ulsan Hyundai High School
10	FW	Kang Ji-woo	9 May 2000 (aged 19)	(Korea Football Association) Korea University Sejong Campus
11	FW	Choo Hyo-joo	29 July 2000 (aged 19)	(Korea Football Association) University of Ulsan
12	DF	Lee Deok-ju	26 December 2000 (aged 18)	(Korea Football Association) Gangwon State University
13	MF	Yun Hyeon-ji	19 January 2000 (aged 19)	(Korea Football Association) Uiduk University
14	MF	Jung Min-young	28 September 2000 (aged 19)	(Korea Football Association) Korea University Sejong Campus
15	FW	Choi Dak-yeong	8 November 2000 (aged 18)	(Korea Football Association) Uiduk University
16	FW	Lee Jeong-min	11 November 2000 (aged 18)	(Korea Football Association) Uiduk University
17	FW	Hyun Seul-gi	28 January 2001 (aged 18)	(Korea Football Association) Gangwon State University
18	GK	Kim Su-jeong	12 September 2001 (aged 18)	(Korea Football Association) Ulsan Hyundai High School
19	FW	Lee Eun-young	31 March 2002 (aged 17)	(Korea Football Association) Ulsan Hyundai High School
20	DF	Koo Chae-hyeon	26 November 2000 (aged 18)	(Korea Football Association) Korea University Sejong Campus
21	GK	Kim Min-young	14 November 2001 (aged 17)	(Korea Football Association) Gyeongnam Robot High School
22	FW	Chun Ga-ram	19 October 2002 (aged 17)	(Korea Football Association) Chungju Yeseong Girls' High School
23	MF	Kim Hye-jeong	10 August 2001 (aged 18)	(Korea Football Association) Hwacheon Information Industry High School

=== Myanmar ===
Coach: Thet Thet Win

The final squad was announced on 22 October 2019.

No.	Pos.	Player	Date of birth (age)	Club
1	GK	Zu Latt Nadi	22 December 2000 (aged 18)	(Myanmar Football Federation) ISPE
2	DF	Hnin Mya Thazin	25 May 2001 (aged 18)	(Myanmar Football Federation) YREO
3	DF	Naw Htet Htet Wai	30 July 2000 (aged 19)	(Myanmar Football Federation) YREO
4	DF	Zune Yu Ya Oo	12 February 2001 (aged 18)	(Myanmar Football Federation) YREO
5	DF	Nant Zu Zu Htet	26 September 2000 (aged 19)	(Myanmar Football Federation) Myawady
6	MF	Pont Pont Pyae Maung	16 October 2003 (aged 16)	(Myanmar Football Federation) YREO
7	MF	Bawe Lyan Kane	22 February 2000 (aged 19)	(Myanmar Football Federation) YREO
8	MF	May Phu Ko	29 October 2001 (aged 17)	(Myanmar Football Federation) ISPE
9	FW	San Thaw Thaw	9 January 2001 (aged 18)	(Myanmar Football Federation) Zwekapin United
10	MF	Nwe Ni Win	2 July 2000 (aged 19)	(Myanmar Football Federation) YREO
11	MF	Lin Myint Mo	9 June 2002 (aged 17)	(Myanmar Football Federation) ISPE
12	MF	Win Win	12 February 2003 (aged 16)	(Myanmar Football Federation) Zwekapin United
13	MF	Moe Moe Than	14 December 2000 (aged 18)	(Myanmar Football Federation) Sport & Education
14	DF	Ei Ei Kyaw	1 April 2002 (aged 17)	(Myanmar Football Federation) Sport & Education
15	DF	Moe Ma Ma Soe	24 May 2001 (aged 18)	(Myanmar Football Federation) ISPE
16	MF	Thazin Aung	20 May 2002 (aged 17)	(Myanmar Football Federation) YREO
17	FW	Aye Myat Khaing	17 October 2001 (aged 18)	(Myanmar Football Federation) Myawady
18	GK	Khin Myat Moe	15 November 2004 (aged 14)	(Myanmar Football Federation) Sport & Education
19	FW	Swe Mar Aung	11 March 2003 (aged 16)	(Myanmar Football Federation) YREO
20	FW	Myat Noe Khin	24 July 2003 (aged 16)	(Myanmar Football Federation) YREO
21	DF	Phyu Phyu Win	1 December 2004 (aged 14)	(Myanmar Football Federation) YREO
22	MF	.May Htet Lu	28 January 2003 (aged 16)	(Myanmar Football Federation)
23	GK	Kyi Pyar Lin	13 June 2002 (aged 17)	(Myanmar Football Federation) Sport & Education
