= Tennis in the United States =

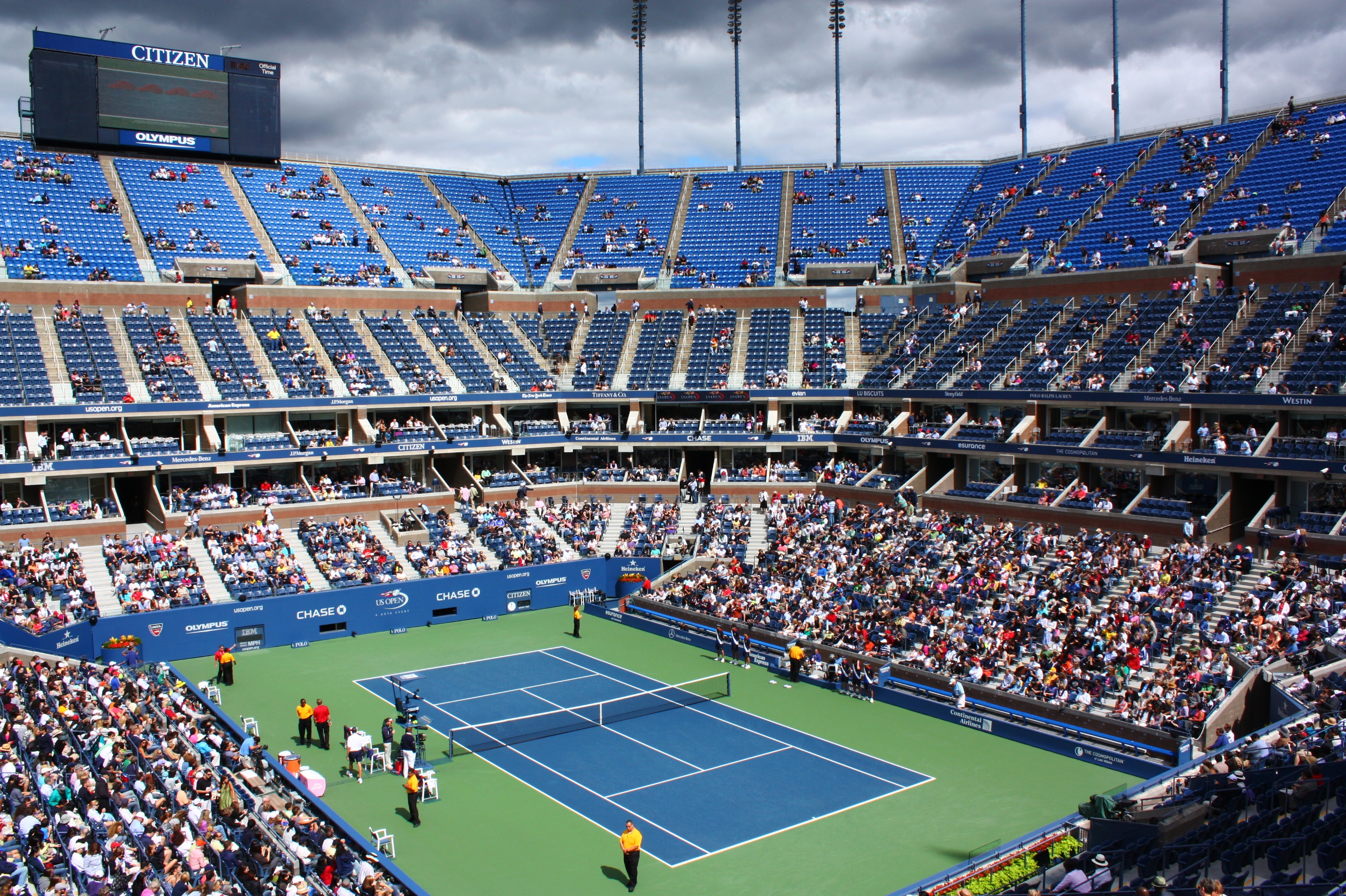
- Arthur Ashe Stadium in 2010
- Country: United States
- Governing body: United States Tennis Association
- National team: United States Olympics team

National competitions
- US Open

International competitions
- Davis Cup; Summer Olympics; Wimbledon; French Open; Australian Open

Tennis was first played in the United States in the 1870s. Throughout the 20th and 21st centuries, many American tennis players, such as Serena Williams, Venus Williams, Billie Jean King, Chris Evert, Martina Navratilova, Andre Agassi, and Pete Sampras have achieved international success. The United States Tennis Association (USTA) is the governing board for tennis in the United States, and is responsible for the promotion and development of tennis players in the U.S. It was known as the National Lawn Tennis Association until 1975.

== History ==
The first tennis clubs in the United States were formed in the mid-1870s. Mary Ewing Outerbridge allegedly introduced the sport to the U.S. after witnessing it in Bermuda. She brought a lawn tennis kit including rackets, balls, net posts and a net home with her. Her brother, the director of the Staten Island Cricket and Base Ball Club, arranged for the creation of a lawn tennis court on the club's grounds. The sport became popular among the upper classes. Tennis clubs were soon established across the country, particularly along the Eastern Seaboard and in New England.

In 1881, the United States National Lawn Tennis Association (USNLTA) was founded in order to organize all tennis activities across the country under the presidency of James Dwight. In August, the first edition of the US Open Championship was held on grass courts at the Newport Casino in Newport, Rhode Island. Only clubs which were members of the USNLTA were permitted to enter, and the tournament was male-only. Richard Sears was the first winner of the men's singles competition, and would go on to win seven consecutive titles. In 1887, the first U.S. Women's National Singles Championship was held at the Philadelphia Cricket Club. The winner was 17-year-old Philadelphian Ellen Hansell.

In 1900, a tennis tournament between competing American and British teams was staged at the Longwood Cricket Club in Boston, Massachusetts. It was called the International Lawn Tennis Challenge. The American team was captained by Dwight F. Davis, in whose honor the tournament was later renamed the Davis Cup.

== Notable players ==
=== Amateur Era ===
American tennis players dominated much of the amateur era, particularly throughout its first few decades. Multi-time major champions in this era included Richard Sears, Bill Tilden, Don Budge and Bobby Riggs on the men's side. Multi-time women's champions included May Sutton, who became the first American to win a singles title at Wimbledon in 1905; Alice Marble, a triple Wimbledon champion whose style was characterised as masculine because of her aggressive pursuit of the ball; Helen Wills, who helped to popularize the overhand serve for women in the 1940s; Maureen Connolly; and Althea Gibson, who was the first Black American woman to win a major.

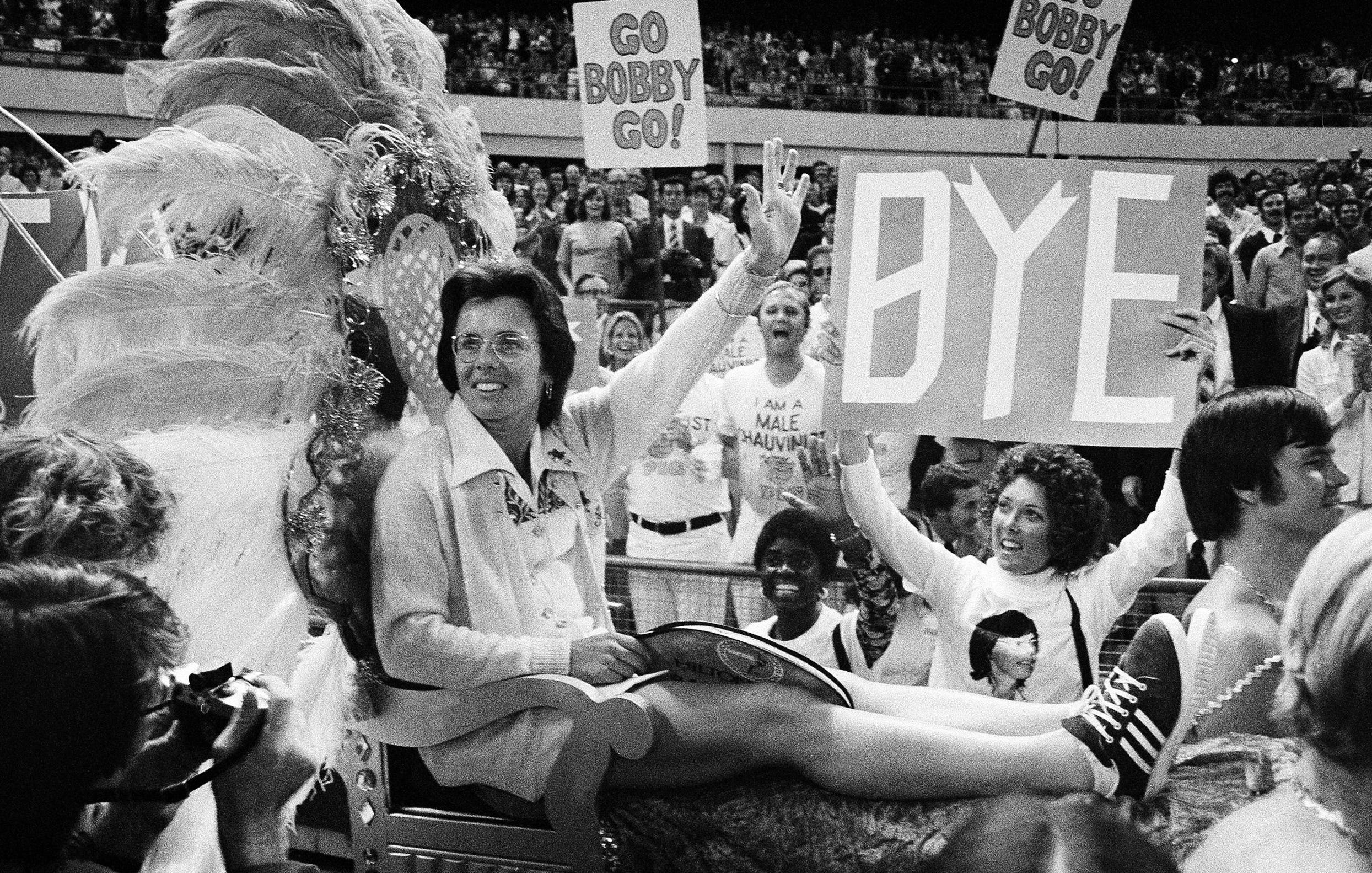
Billie Jean King is carried onto court for her 1973 "Battle of the Sexes" match with Bobby Riggs.

=== 1960s ===
The Open Era started in 1968. Its advent bisected the career of American icon Billie Jean King, who had won her first major singles title at Wimbledon in 1966. She went on to claim a total of 12 major singles titles, 16 major doubles titles, and 11 major mixed doubles titles. She was also a notable advocate for gender equality. Another American icon whose career spanned both eras was Arthur Ashe, who was the first Black player selected to the United States Davis Cup team, and the only Black man ever to win the singles titles at Wimbledon, the US Open, and the Australian Open.

=== 1970s ===
The 1970s welcomed several new American major singles champions. On the men's side, Stan Smith won the US Open in 1971 and Wimbledon in 1972; Roscoe Tanner won the Australian Open in January 1977; and Vitas Gerulaitis won the Australian Open in December 1977. The decade was presided over by Jimmy Connors, who won five of his ten major singles titles in the 1970s and first became ranked ATP world No. 1 in July 1974. Billie Jean King continued to win titles on the women's side, as did Chris Evert, who turned pro in 1972, became WTA world No. 1 in November 1975, and won multiple singles titles at the French Open, Wimbledon and US Open throughout the decade. Tracy Austin won her first of two major singles titles at the US Open in 1979, and Barbara Jordan won the Australian Open that same year.

=== 1980s ===
The 1980s was a golden age for American tennis. Austin was ranked as the world No. 1 in April 1980, and won another major title in 1981. However, the decade was dominated by on the women's side by Evert and Martina Navratilova, who had changed her citizenship from Czech to American in 1975 and won her first two major singles titles at Wimbledon in 1978 and 1979. Navratilova became world No. 1 for the first time in July 1978 and spent 332 weeks there across her career, the second-most of all time. She won an Open Era-record 59 major titles, including 18 in singles.

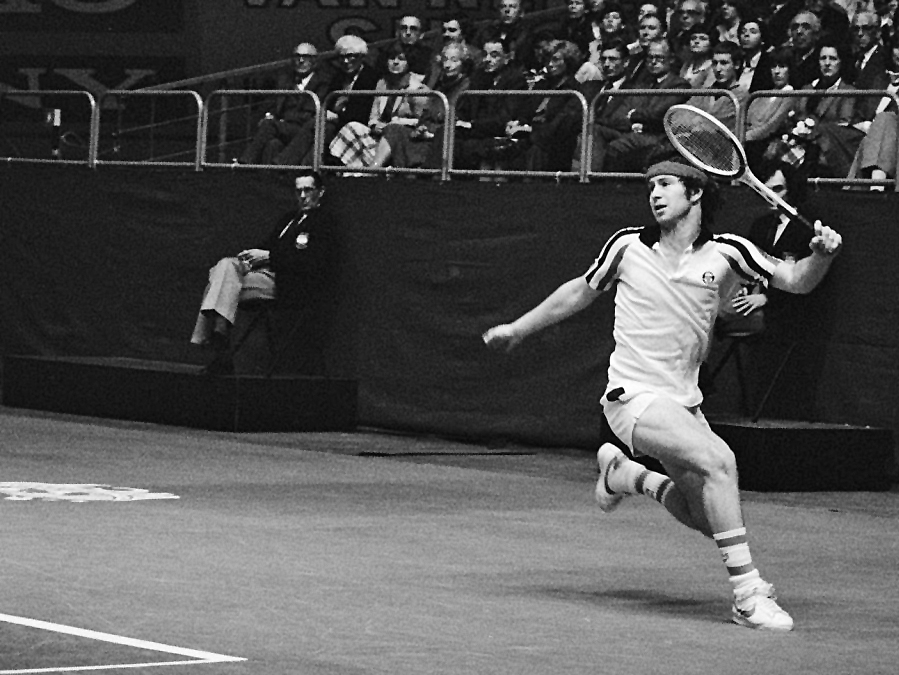
John McEnroe on court in 1979.

On the men's side, the most prolific American player of the 1980s was John McEnroe. Having claimed his first singles major at the US Open in 1979, he became world no. 1 in March 1980 and went on to win a career total of seven major singles titles at the US Open and Wimbledon. He also brought a great deal of public attention to the sport, due to his exciting shot-making, his rivalries with Jimmy Connors and Björn Borg, and his confrontational on-court behavior, which frequently landed him in trouble with umpires and tennis authorities. Johan Kriek and Michael Chang also brought home one major singles title each, at the 1982 Australian Open and 1989 French Open respectively.

=== 1990s ===
The 1990s were similarly successful for American men. Three of them claimed the world No. 1 singles ranking in that decade: Jim Courier in February 1992, Pete Sampras in April 1993, and Andre Agassi in April 1995. Courier won major singles titles at the French Open in 1991 and 1992, and the Australian Open in 1992 and 1993. Sampras won fourteen major singles tournaments, a record at the time of his retirement, and missed out only on a French Open title. He was known for his booming serve, and mastery of the serve-and-volley technique. Agassi won eight major singles titles, and achieved the Career Grand Slam. He was the first man to win all four singles majors across three different surfaces (hard, clay and grass), and remains the most recent American man to win the French Open (in 1999) and the Australian Open (in 2003). The Sampras–Agassi rivalry fascinated the public due to their contrasting styles and temperaments.

The 1990s were less successful for American women. Martina Navratilova claimed her final major singles title at Wimbledon in 1990. The first half of the decade was largely dominated by German Steffi Graf and Serbian Monica Seles. In 1993, Seles was stabbed on court by a Graf fan, halting her career. She returned to the sport in 1994 after becoming an American citizen, and won a final singles major at the Australian Open in 1996 under the American flag. In 1998, Lindsay Davenport claimed her first of three major singles titles at the US Open, and became world No. 1 in October. The final first-time American winner of a singles major in the 1990s was Serena Williams at the US Open in 1999.

=== 2000s ===
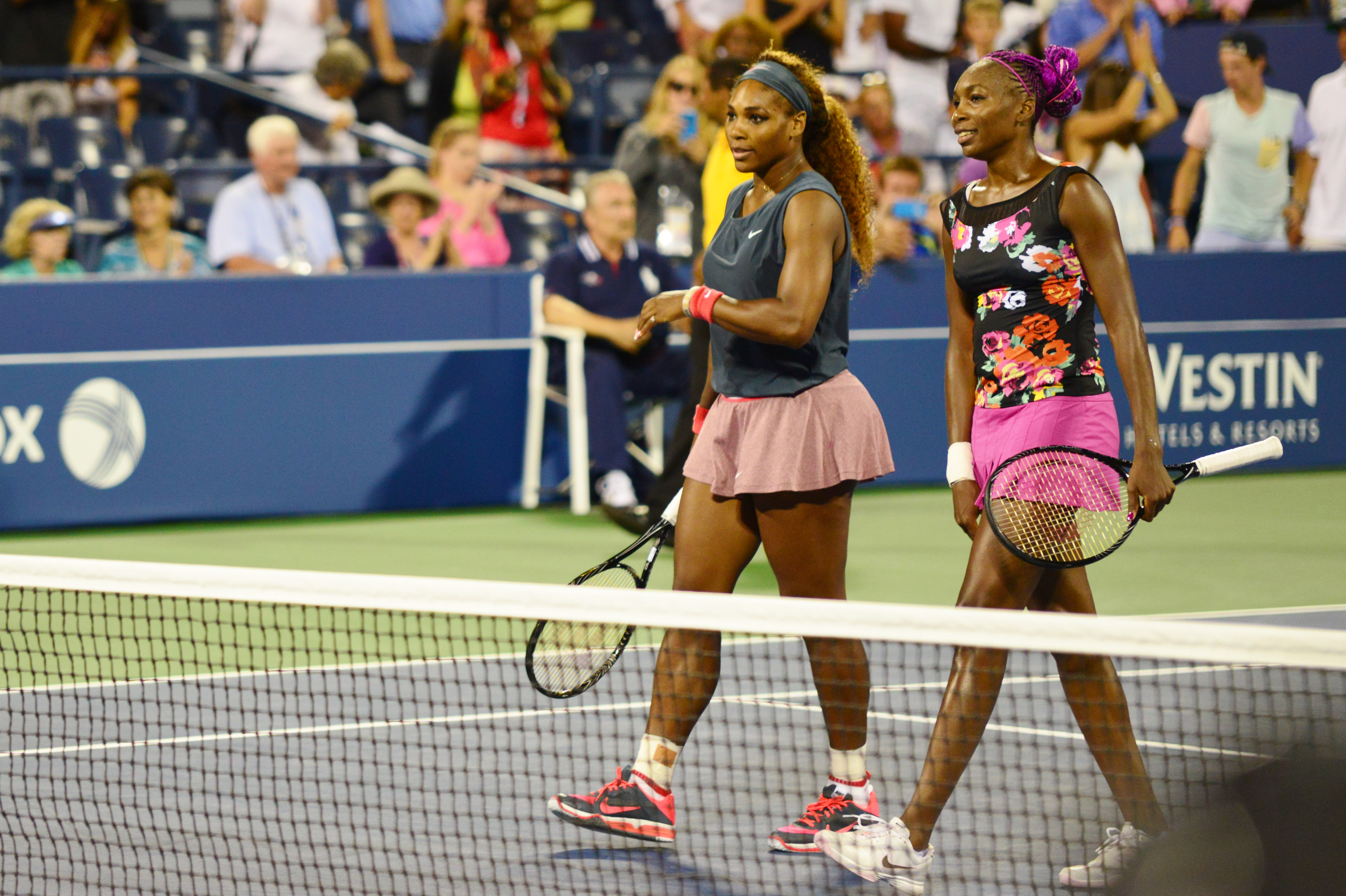
Serena and Venus Williams share the court at the 2013 US Open.

Serena and her older sister Venus Williams quickly began to dominate the WTA Tour. Venus claimed the world No. 1 ranking for the first time in February 2002; Serena followed her just five months later, in July. Serena would become the most successful women's player of both the 2000s and the 2010s. She was ranked as the singles world No. 1 for 319 weeks (third-most of all time), and finished as the year-end No. 1 five times. She won 73 WTA Tour–level singles titles, including 23 major singles titles—the most in the Open Era, and the second-most of all time. Venus won seven major singles titles, all of them in the 2000s, and clinched 49 Tour-level singles titles. They also won 14 doubles major titles together, and are unbeaten in major doubles finals. No other American women won major singles titles in the 2000s.

Sampras won his final major singles title at the US Open in 2002, and Agassi at the Australian Open in 2003. Also in 2003, Andy Roddick won his lone major singles title at the US Open, and became ranked world No. 1 in November. He reached four other major singles finals but lost them all to Roger Federer, including their last and most closely-contested Wimbledon final in 2009. To date, he remains the last American man to win a singles major.

=== 2010s ===
Serena Williams won twelve of her 23 major singles titles in the 2010s, and retired in September 2022. She is considered by many to be the greatest women's player of all time. Sloane Stephens became the second American woman to win a major singles title that decade at the 2017 US Open, where she defeated compatriot Madison Keys in the final. No American man won a major singles title or even reached a major singles final, with the decade dominated by the European "Big Four": Swiss Roger Federer, Spanish Rafael Nadal, Serbian Novak Djokovic and British Andy Murray.

=== 2020s ===
The most successful American player of the 2020s so far has been Coco Gauff, who has won two major singles titles – at the US Open in 2023 and the French Open in 2025 – and hit a career-high ranking of world No. 2. The other American major women's singles champions of the decade are Sofia Kenin at the Australian Open in 2020 and Madison Keys at the Australian Open in 2025. Singles finalists include Jennifer Brady at the Australian Open in 2021, Danielle Collins at the Australian Open in 2022, Jessica Pegula at the US Open in 2024, and Amanda Anisimova at Wimbledon and the US Open in 2025. American men have continued their title drought at the singles majors, with the European stranglehold at the top of men's tennis continuing under Jannik Sinner and Carlos Alcaraz. At the 2024 US Open, Taylor Fritz became the first American man to contest a major singles final since Andy Roddick, but lost to Sinner in straight sets.

== Tournaments ==
There are 15 total active ATP, WTA, and Grand Slam tennis tournaments held in the United States. Twelve events are held on hard courts, two on clay, and one on grass. Six are ATP only, four are WTA only, and five tournaments are combined events. The US Open is one of four Grand Slam tennis tournaments. It is played in late August to early September at the USTA Billie Jean King National Tennis Center in Queens, New York. The Indian Wells Masters, Miami Open and Cincinnati Masters are part of the ATP Tour Masters 1000 and the WTA 1000. In 2025, the Dallas & Newport ATP 250 events will merge licenses with Dallas being upgraded to a 500 and Newport being phased out.

Active ATP / WTA Tennis Tournaments Held in the United States
Number	Title	Location	Tour	Level	Held	Surface	Founded
1	Dallas Open	Dallas, TX	ATP	250 (2024) 500 (2025)	February	Hard	2022
2	Delray Beach Open	Delray Beach, FL	ATP	250	February	Hard	1993
3	Southern California Open	San Diego, CA	WTA	500	February - March	Hard	1971
4	ATX Open	Austin, TX	WTA	250	February - March	Hard	2023
5	BNP Paribas Open	Indian Wells, CA	Both	Masters 1000	March	Hard	1974
6	Miami Open presented by Itaú	Miami, FL	Both	Masters 1000	March	Hard	1985
7	Credit One Charleston Open	Charleston, SC	WTA	500	April	Clay	1973
8	U.S. Men's Clay Court Championships	Houston, TX	ATP	250	April	Clay	1910
9	Infosys Hall of Fame Open	Newport, RI	ATP	250	July	Grass	1976
10	Atlanta Open	Atlanta, GA	ATP	250	July	Hard	2010
11	Mubadala Citi DC Open	Washington, D.C	Both	500	July - August	Hard	1969
12	Cincinnati Open	Cincinnati, OH	Both	Masters 1000	August	Hard	1899
13	Tennis in the Land	Cleveland, OH	WTA	250	August	Hard	2021
14	Winston-Salem Open	Winston-Salem, NC	ATP	250	August	Hard	1981 2011
15	US Open Tennis Championships	Queens, NY	Both	Grand Slam	August -September	Hard	1881

== See also ==
- Women's tennis in the United States
- List of American tennis players at the Summer Olympics
