= Tennis South Africa =

Sports governing body in South Africa

Tennis South Africa Association
- Sport: Tennis
- Abbreviation: (TSA)
- Founded: 10 September 2000; 25 years ago
- Affiliation: International Tennis Federation
- Regional affiliation: Confederation of African Tennis
- Location: Block 12, East in Centurion, Pretoria, Gauteng
- President: Gavin Crookes

Official website
- www.tennissa.co.za

Tennis South Africa (TSA) is the national governing body for the sport of tennis in South Africa. It is a not-for-profit organization, which "invests its proceeds to promote and develop the growth of tennis, from the grass-roots to the professional levels and to raise funds for and on behalf of tennis players and the game of tennis within the Republic of South Africa". The TSA is affiliated to both International Tennis Federation and Confederation of African Tennis. The association was created to standardise rules and regulations and to promote and develop the growth of tennis in South Africa.

== Affiliate members ==
This is a list of provincial affiliated members of TSA, according to the constitution of TSA the affiliation of members has to be revised after fixed interval of period.

- Boland Tennis Association
- Border Tennis Association
- Tennis Eastern Province
- Eden Tennis Association
- Free State Tennis Association
- Gauteng Central Tennis Association
- Gauteng East Tennis Association
- Gauteng North Tennis Association
- KwaZulu Natal Tennis Association
- Limpopo Tennis Association
- Mpumalanga Tennis Association
- Northern Cape Tennis Association
- North West Tennis Association
- Western Province Tennis

== Board members ==
The board of the association comprises not less than nine and not more than twelve members; as described by the constitution of association. The board should at all time comprise at least 50% of members representing previously disadvantaged communities. The board members appointed for the term of three years. The current board members of the association are:

Name	Position
Gavin Crookes	President
Riad Davids	Vice-president
Richard Glover	CEO
Hubert Brody	Member
Gugu Ntuli	Member
Shaun Liebenberg	Member
Geoff Whyte	Member
Anthony Loubser	Member
Jacob Klaasen	Member
Fuad Cassiem	Member
Zaida Beukes	Member
David Allan Karam	Member
Gustav Fichardt	Member
Muditambi Ravele	Wheelchair Tennis Representative
Bridget Visee	Coaches Representative
David Jaquire	Schools Representative
Bertie Conradie	Seniors Representative

== See also ==
- South Africa Davis Cup team
- South Africa Fed Cup team
- South Africa at the Hopman Cup
- Women's tennis in South Africa
