= Shino Matsuda =

Japanese association football player

Personal information
- Date of birth: 27 March 2001 (age 25)
- Place of birth: Chiba Prefecture, Japan
- Height: 1.60 m (5 ft 3 in)
- Position: Defender

Team information
- Current team: Tokyo Verdy Beleza
- Number: 13

Senior career*
Years	Team	Apps	(Gls)
- Tokyo Verdy Beleza
- * Club domestic league appearances and goals

Shino Matsuda (born 27 March 2001) is a Japanese professional footballer who plays as a defender for WE League club Tokyo Verdy Beleza.

== Biography ==
Matsuda was born in Chiba Prefecture, Japan. She started playing football at around the age of 3 because of her brother's influence.

== Club career ==
Matsuda made her WE League debut on 12 September 2021.
