= Susan Phonsongkham =

Australian footballer (born 2001)

Personal information
- Full name: Rasamee Phonsongkham
- Date of birth: 12 February 2001 (age 25)
- Place of birth: Thailand
- Position: Midfielder

Team information
- Current team: Perth Glory
- Number: 10

Youth career
- Burwood FC
- Westfields Sports High School
- Sydney Olympic

Senior career*
Years	Team	Apps	(Gls)
2017–2021	Western Sydney Wanderers	19	(1)
2021–	Perth Glory	41	(7)
2022	→ KR Reykjavík (loan)	14	(5)
2023	→ Bankstown City (loan)	19	(14)

International career^{‡}
2017–2019	Australia U19	13	(3)
- * Club domestic league appearances and goals as of 28 May 2024 ‡ National team caps and goals as of 22 October 2023

Rasamee "Susan" Phonsongkham (Thai: รัศมี พลสงคราม, romanized: Rạṣ̄mī phl s̄ngkhrām, pronounced [rát.sà.mǐː pʰon˧ sǒŋ.kʰraːm˧]; born 12 February 2001) is a soccer player who plays as a midfielder or attacker for Perth Glory. Born in Thailand, she is an Australia youth international.

== Early life ==
Born in Thailand, where she was discouraged from playing football, Phonsongkham moved to Australia with her mother in 2012 to escape domestic violence. She grew up in New South Wales and attended Petersham Public School where she excelled in all sports, including cricket and Australian Football.

== Youth career ==
Phonsongkham played for Burwood Girls High and for the local youth club, where she once scored fifty-two goals in one season, before being recruited by Westfields Sports High School.

She has also played for Sydney Olympic and Football NSW Institute.

== Senior club career ==
=== Western Sydney Wanderers ===
Phonsongkham started her senior career with Australian side Western Sydney Wanderers. She scored her first goal for the Wanderers during a 1–1 draw with Melbourne City, which was described as a "wonder goal". Altogether, she played for the club for four seasons. During the 2019–20 season, she was regarded as one of the best young attacking prospects in the Australian W-League, but suffered a back injury.

=== Perth Glory ===
In 2021, she signed for Australian side Perth Glory, playing as a forward and mid-fielder, and scored a goal on her debut. However, she suffered a knee injury that first season. In 2022, she signed for Icelandic side KR, before returning to Perth Glory.

== International career ==
Phonsongkham was a part of the Australia women's national under-20 soccer team, including participating in the 2019 AFC U-19 Women's Championship.

== Style of play ==
Phonsongkham is known for her ball control. Phonsonkham can operate as a midfielder or as an attacker.
