= Women's basketball in Australia =

During the 1970s and 1980s, Australian women's basketball was successful in terms of attracting participants and having a competitive team on the international stages. This success did not translate into sponsorship and financial support for the sport.

The WNBL was founded during the early 1980s to help improve the quality of the domestic play with the hope of providing a pathway for top Australian players to join the national team.

== Aboriginal women ==
Aboriginal women who have played basketball on a high level include Joanne Lesiputty. Lesiputty quit the sport to pursue a softball career. Laura Agius was an aboriginal basketball player who represented South Australia. Leonie Dickson and Bobbie Dillon, both Tasmanians, also represented their state on the national level.

== Wheelchair basketball ==
Wheelchair basketball
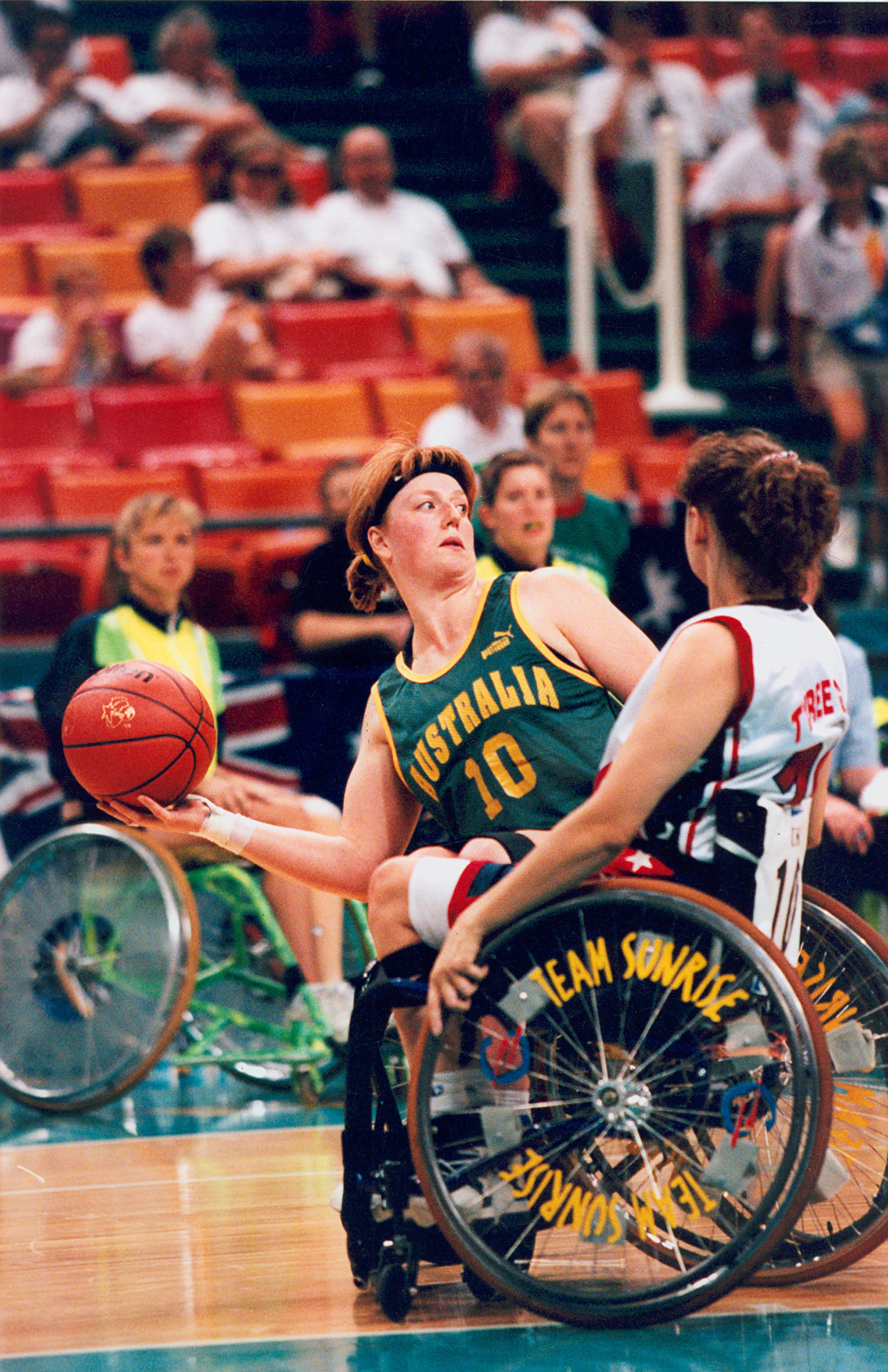
Sharon Slann at the 1996 Summer Paralympics

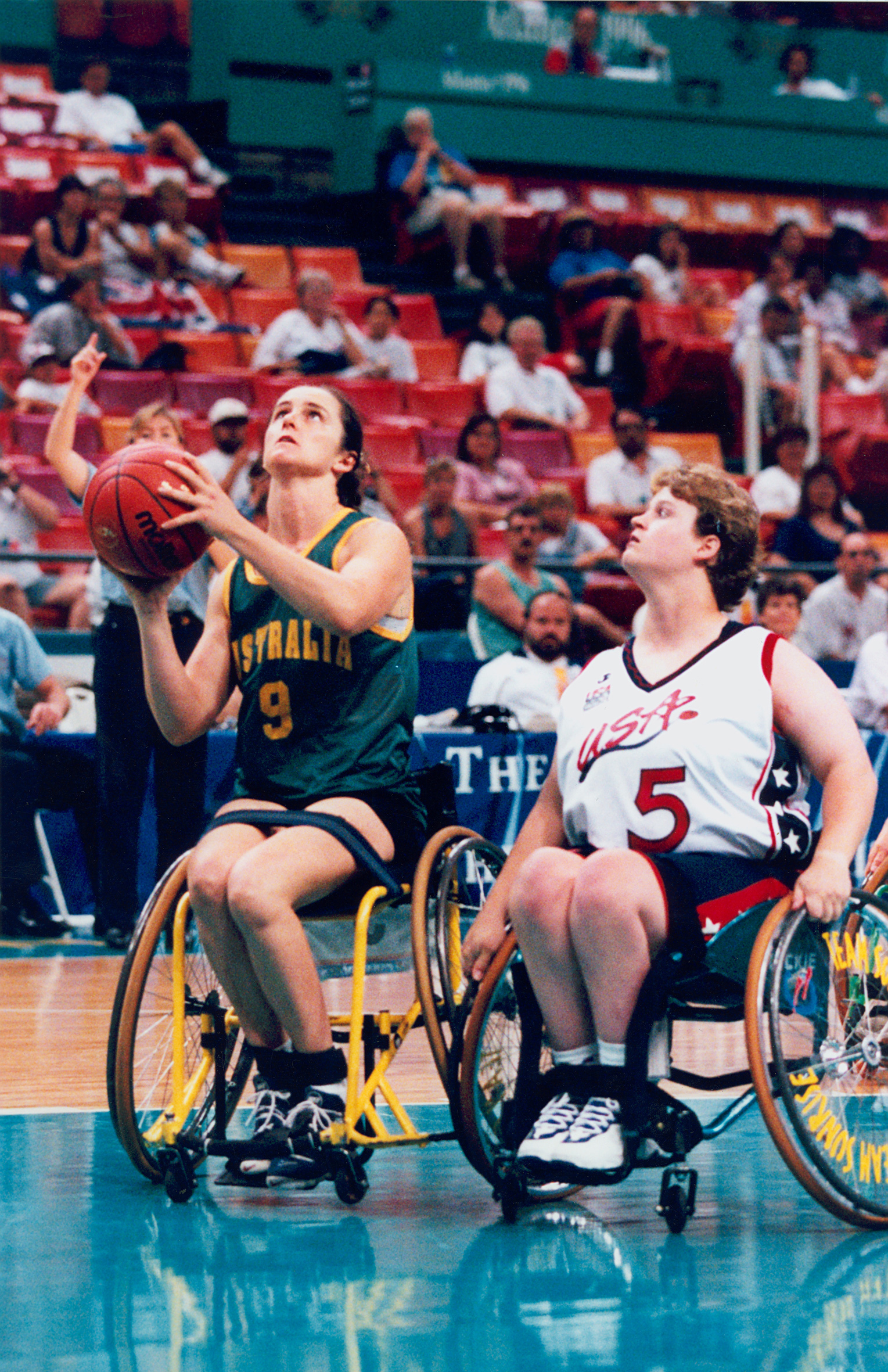
Liesl Tesch at the 1996 Summer Paralympics

Women have been active in playing wheelchair basketball in Australia for several years. They first appeared on the Paralympic seen at the 1992 Summer Paralympics, despite women's wheelchair basketball being competed for at the Paralympics since 1968. Notable players include Liesl Tesch and Donna Ritchie.

== Professional basketball ==
Women's basketball is nominally a professional sport in Australia. In 2009, the salaries for average players in the WNBL were not high enough to allow them to play basketball full-time: They made between $5,000 - $10,000 a year.

=== Women's National Basketball League ===
WNBL	Team	City	Arena	Colours	Joined WNBL	Head coach	Ref
Women's National Basketball League
Women's National Basketball League	Adelaide Lightning	Adelaide, SA	Adelaide Arena	Red, Yellow, Black, White	1992	Peter Buckle	
Women's National Basketball League	Australian Institute of Sport	Canberra, ACT	AIS Training Hall	Blue, White, Red	1981	Phil Brown	
Women's National Basketball League	Bendigo Spirit	Bendigo, VIC	Schweppes Centre	Sky Blue, Gold, White	2007	Bernie Harrower	
Women's National Basketball League	Bulleen Boomers	Bulleen, VIC	Veneto Club	Blue, Gold	1984	Tom Maher	
Women's National Basketball League	Canberra Capitals	Canberra, ACT	AIS Arena	Light Blue, White, Gold	1986	Carrie Graf	
Women's National Basketball League	Dandenong Rangers	Dandenong, VIC	Dandenong Basketball Stadium	Bottle Green, Gold	1992	Mark Wright	
Women's National Basketball League	Logan Thunder	Logan, QLD	Logan Metro	Purple, Burgundy, Gold	2008	Olaf Lange	
Women's National Basketball League	Sydney Flames	Sydney, NSW	Sydney University	Blue, Gold, White	1989	Karen Dalton	
Women's National Basketball League	Townsville Fire	Townsville, QLD	Townsville RSL Stadium	Black, Red, Orange	2001	Chris Lucas	
Women's National Basketball League	West Coast Waves	Perth, WA	WA Basketball Centre	Green, Yellow, Black	1990	David Herbert	

Women's National Basketball League
Canberra Capitals vs Townsville. 15 October 2011.

Several players warming up for the Canberra Capitals before a 15 October 2011 game against the Townsville Fire.

=== Overseas players ===
Australian athletes have gone overseas to play professional sport. Amongst these are Lauren Jackson, Erin Phillips, Kristi Harrower, Belinda Snell, Penny Taylor and Liz Cambage, all of whom have played basketball in the United States.

== Spectatorship ==
During the 2010/2011 season, the Women's National Basketball League had 77,944 total spectators watch a game live. On television that season, the league had an aggregate of 1,352,096 total viewers.

== National team ==
In 1984, the national team competed at the 1984 Summer Olympics. This was their first appearance at the Olympic Games. Comparatively, their male counterparts first competed at the 1956 Summer Olympics.

In 1988, the national team beat the Soviet Union's national team. This was a historic win for the team. The game was played at the 1988 Summer Olympics and qualified Australia for the semi-finals.

This was the roster for the 2008 Beijing Olympics.

Australia Women's National Basketball Team roster
Players
Coaches

Pos.	No.	Name	Age – Date of birth	Height	Club	Ctr.
G	4	Erin Phillips	23 – 19 July 1985	5 ft 8 in (1.73 m)	Indiana Fever	(United States)
G	5	Tully Bevilaqua	36 – 19 May 1972	5 ft 5 in (1.65 m)	San Antonio Silver Stars	(United States)
G	6	Jennifer Screen	26 – 19 February 1982	5 ft 11 in (1.8 m)	Adelaide Lightning	(Australia)
F	7	Penny Taylor	27 – 24 May 1981	6 ft 0 in (1.83 m)	Phoenix Mercury	(United States)
F/C	8	Suzy Batkovic	27 – 24 May 1981	6 ft 5 in (1.96 m)	Adelaide Lightning	(Australia)
C	9	Hollie Grima	24 – 16 December 1983	6 ft 2 in (1.88 m)	Frisco Sika Brno	(Czech Republic)
PG	10	Kristi Harrower	33 – 4 March 1975	5 ft 4 in (1.63 m)	Bendigo Spirit	(Australia)
F	11	Laura Summerton	24 – 13 December 1983	6 ft 2 in (1.88 m)	Levoni Taranto	(Italy)
F	12	Belinda Snell	27 – 10 January 1981	6 ft 0 in (1.83 m)	Sydney Uni Flames	(Australia)
C	13	Emma Randall	23 – 6 May 1985	6 ft 2 in (1.88 m)	Logan Thunder	(Australia)
C	14	Liz Cambage	16 – 18 August 1991	6 ft 8 in (2.03 m)	Tulsa Shock	(United States)
PF	15	Lauren Jackson (C)	27 – 11 May 1981	6 ft 5 in (1.96 m)	Seattle Storm	(United States)

Head coach

- (Australia) Carrie Graf

Assistant coach(es)

- (Australia) Phil Brown, Michele Timms, Peter Buckle

Legend

- (C) Team captain
- nat field describes country
  of last club
  before the tournament
- Age field is age on 9 August 2008
