= Women's tennis =

Tennis practiced by women

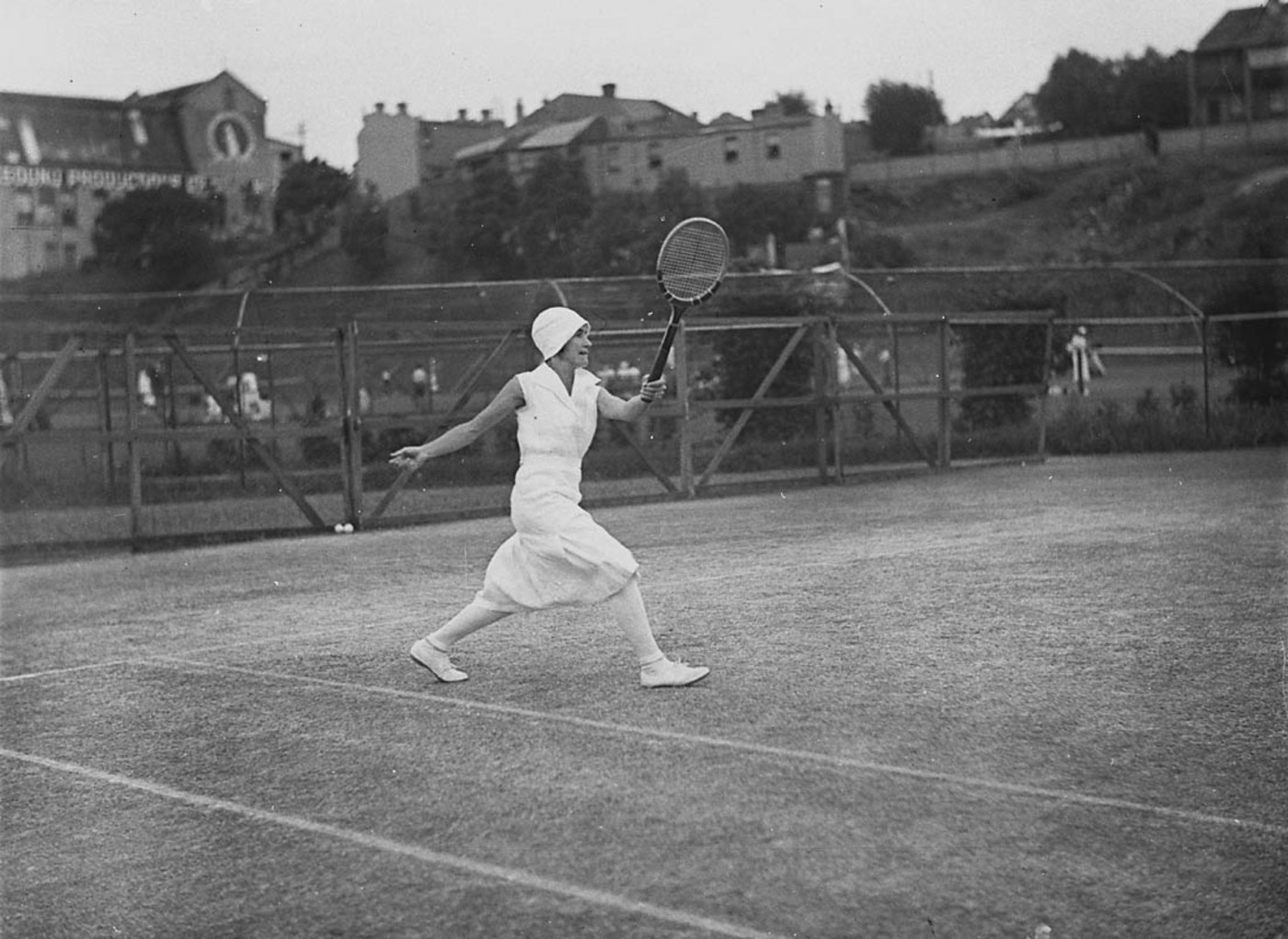
- Women's tennis at White City Stadium (Sydney) during Country Week
- Highest governing body: International Tennis Federation
- First played: Between 1859 and 1865, Birmingham, England

Characteristics
- Contact: No
- Team members: Single or doubles
- Mixed-sex: Yes, separate tours & mixed doubles
- Type: Outdoor
- Equipment: Tennis ball, tennis racket
- Venue: Indoor or outdoor tennis court

Presence
- Country or region: Worldwide
- Olympic: Yes, part of Summer Olympic programme from 1900 to 1924; Demonstration sport in the 1968 and 1984 Summer Olympics; Part of Summer Olympic programme since 1988
- Paralympic: Yes, part of Summer Paralympic programme since 1992

Women's tennis is one of the most popular female sports. It is one of the few in which women command success and popularity that equal those of their male counterparts. Women's Tennis Association is the main organization which runs female tennis.

== History ==
Women's tennis was first included during the 1900 Paris Olympic Games, yet women's doubles were not implemented until 1920 during the Antwerp Games.

However, it wasn't until the founding of the Women's Tennis Association in the 1970s that the sport was formally established.

One of the first superstars of women's tennis is Suzanne Lenglen, who after six titles won at Wimbledon and the Internationaux de France left amateur tennis to achieve a first professional tour in North America in 1926–1927.

== Features of women's tennis ==
In women's tennis matches the ball is usually played without effect (less than lift) and games tend to play more from the baseline; typing is generally less powerful than men. The game is made in a more tactical speed and anticipation. The service is also less powerful; it is relatively less important than for men. However, there has been a noted evolution in this field since the 1990s, women's tennis is improving and is growing more and more popular.

Fastest Service Speed at Wimbledon
| Player | Year | Service speed |
|---|---|---|
| Gabriela Sabatini | 1992 | 146 km/h |
| Nathalie Tauziat | 1995 | 159 km/h |
| Steffi Graf | 1998 | 171 km/h |
| Kim Clijsters | 2004 | 188 km/h |
| Amélie Mauresmo | 2006 | 193 km/h |
| Venus Williams | 2007 | 208 km/h |
| Sabine Lisicki | 2014 | 211 km/h |

== Controversy ==
Women's tennis has been marked by several cases, including cases of sexual abuse by trainers. The world of women's tennis has been described as "homophobic" and "sexist".

== See also ==
- Battle of the Sexes
- Women's tennis in Australia
- Women's tennis in South Africa
- Women's tennis in the United States

== Bibliography ==
- Le tennis féminin français, Vincent Cognet, Romain Lefebvre, Philippe Maria, Ed. du stade, 1999 (ISBN 2745602713)
- Les dessous du tennis féminin, Nathalie Tauziat, ed. J'ai lu, 2001 (ISBN 2290312193)
- N'oublie pas de gagner: Dans les coulisses du tennis féminin, Dominique Bonnot, ed. Stock, 20157 (ISBN 9782234078338)
- Women's Tennis Tactics, Rob Antoun, Human Kinetics, 2007 (ISBN 9780736065726)
