= Women's tennis in Australia =

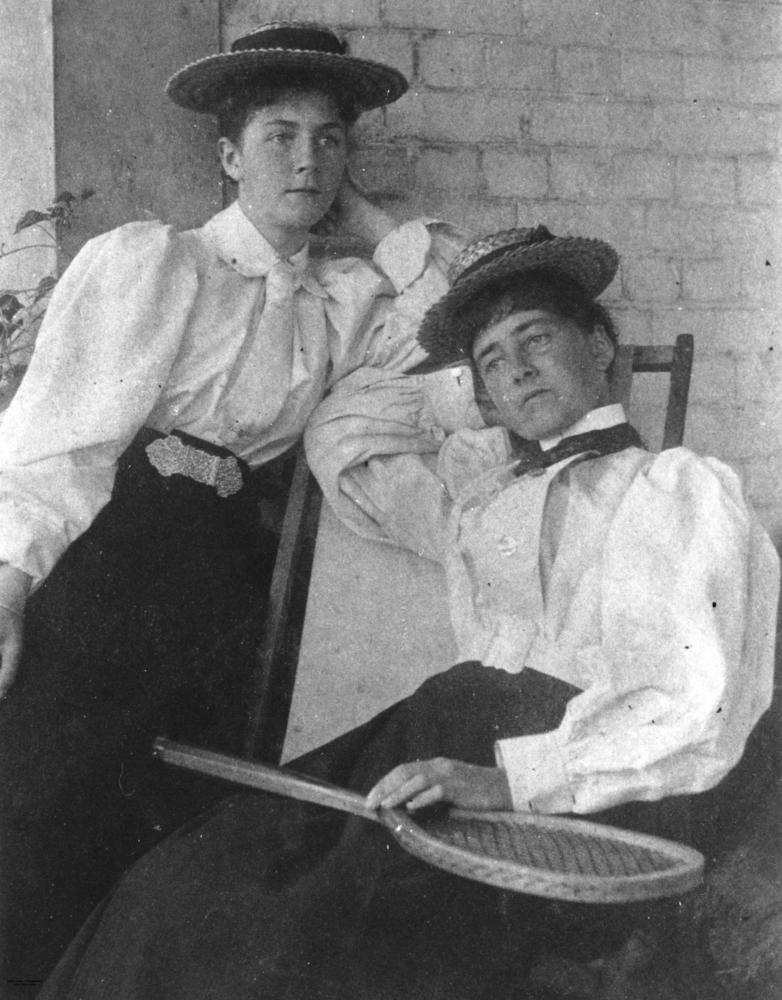
- Two women dressed for a game of tennis

While not being urged to avoid competition, women had few opportunities to compete in sport in Australia until the 1880s. After that date, new sporting facilities were being built around the country and many new sport clubs were created. One of the reason women were encouraged to play croquet, tennis and golf during the late 1800s was because it was seen as beneficial to their health. These sports were also seen as passive, non-aggressive and non-threatening to the period's concepts of masculinity and femininity.

The Australasian Sketcher with Pen and Pencil from 4 March 1882 ran a lithograph of men and women playing tennis together. In this era, tennis courts were sometimes part of the grounds of Australian mansions.

Tennis was occasionally played aboard ships in Australia. Some of these matches were played by women.

Sphairistike was an early form of tennis. It was being played in Brisbane by 1876 by women. By the end of the 1870s, a number of Women's tennis clubs and mixed gender tennis clubs had been established in Australia and Queensland. By the mid-1880s, these clubs were well established and women's participation in the sport was widely accepted. During this time period, Australian women wore long skirts and long sleeved blouses to play the game. Clubs that had been established Maryborough, Bundaberg, Charters Towers, Ipswich, Gladstone, Townsville, Warwick, and Toowoomba. Tennis was not cheap: women were also playing on private courts. Racquets cost between fifteen shillings and two pounds. Balls cost one shilling. At the time, most working women made about two pounds a week. Beyond the cities and towns, tennis was also being played in the bush during this time period.

In Australia and Queensland's early colonial history, tennis and croquet were acceptable sports for society women to participate in. During that period, women wore big hats and dresses that covered their arms and legs. In 1908, playing outfits also featured high collared, long sleeved shirts and ties. This uniform had changed little by 1917. By 1920, the uniforms had changed and girls were allowed to wear "holland uniforms" that featured skirts that went down to mid-calf, thigh-high stockings, a heavy hat and gloves taken off before the match, and a tie.

Interstate tennis was established by 1908, when the Queensland Ladies' Interstate Tennis Team counted as its team members May Thurlow, Maud Larad, Eva Thurlow and Florence Horton.

Several tennis clubs were created in Queensland during the early part of the 1900s. One such club was the Cosmo Tennis Club of Gympie. It was active around 1911 and provided its female members a chance to socialise and play in a competitive environment. Others clubs were the Townsville Tennis Club and the Charters Towers Tennis Club, which were founded in 1889. Both of these clubs allowed male and female participation. They two clubs regularly competed against each other in the 1900s.

It was hard to get supplies to build tennis courts in rural and bush areas during the 1900s. One of the alternative supplies used for the ground for tennis courts in the bush was crushed termite nests. Mixed gender tennis was being played in Queensland by 1909 at places like the Endeavour Tennis Club in Cooktown. As this area was particularly rural and isolated, the tennis club helped to create community connections that might not exist otherwise. Mixed gendered and single women's tennis was played in the bush on stations like Gracemere Station during the 1910s and 1920s.

In 1922, a committee in Australia investigated the benefits of physical education for girls. They came up with several recommendations regarding what sports were and were not appropriate for girls to play based on the level of fitness required. It was determined that for some individual girls that for medical reasons, the girls should probably not be allowed to participate in tennis, netball, lacrosse, golf, hockey, and cricket. Soccer was completely medically inappropriate for girls to play. It was medically appropriate for all girls to be able to participate in, so long as they were not done in an overly competitive manner, swimming, rowing, cycling and horseback riding.

In 1934, the Victorian Women's Centennial Sports Carnival was held. The event was organised by the Victorian Women's Amateur Sports Council and held at the Melbourne Cricket Ground. The purpose was to increase women's interest in sport by providing them opportunities to play. Sports that were included on the programme included cricket, field hockey, women's basketball, bowls, rowing, swimming, athletics, rifle shooting, baseball, golf, tennis and badminton. There were over 1,000 bowlers involved over the course a week. Cricket featured a match versus a visiting English side. Women's basketball featured a Victorian side playing against a representative all Australian side. There was a day for watersports such as swimming and rowing. A tennis tournament was held. A field hockey tournament featuring Australian, Kiwi and Fijian teams was played.

In 1940, a study of 314 women in New Zealand and Australia was done. Most of the women in the study were middle class, conservative, Protestant and white. The study found that 183 participated in sport. The most popular sport that these women participated in was tennis, with 86 having played the sport.

The second World War was disruptive to women's tennis in Australia. Some tennis players, such as Nell Hopman, joined up to help the war effort. Other tennis players such as Wilma Fowler joined the Women's Land Army.

Australian women's sports had an advantage over many other women's sport organisations around the world in the period after World War II. Women's sport organisations had largely remained intact and were holding competitions during the war period. This structure survived in the post war period. Women's sport was not hurt because of food rationing, petrol rationing, population disbursement, and other issues facing post-war Europe.

During the 1950s, Australian tennis players competed and won at the Empire Games. These players included Margaret Court and Evonne Cawley.

Daniela Di Toro is a wheelchair tennis player from Australia. She has won the Australian Open ten times, a record number of times.

Ashleigh Barty is an Australian women's tennis play who was ranked number 1 in the world right before her retirement in March 2022. Her most recent major title was the Australian Open held in January 2022.

== See also ==
- Tennis in Australia
- Australia Fed Cup team

== Bibliography ==
- Howard, Bruce (1978). The Proud Australians. Adelaide: Rigby. ISBN 0-7270-1741-1.
- Department of Sport, Recreation and Tourism; Australian Sport Commission (1985). Australian Sport, a profile. Canberra, Australia: Australian Government Publish Service. ISBN 0-644-03667-2.
- Evening Post (19 December 1922). "Women in Print". Evening Post. Vol. CC, no. 147. New Zealand: National Library of New Zealand. p. 7.
- Howell, Max; Howell, Reet; Brown, David W. (1989). The Sporting Image, A pictorial history of Queenslanders at play. Brisbane: University of Queensland Press. ISBN 0-7022-2206-2.
- Stell, Marion K. (1991). Half the Race, A history of Australian women in sport. North Ryde, Australia: HarperCollins. ISBN 0-207-16971-3.
