= The Human Abstract =

The Human Abstract may refer to:

- "The Human Abstract" (poem), a 1794 poem by William Blake
- The Human Abstract (band), an American metal band
  - The Human Abstract (EP), a 2005 demo EP by the band
- "The Human Abstract", a 1969 song by David Axelrod from Songs of Experience
