= The Divine Image =

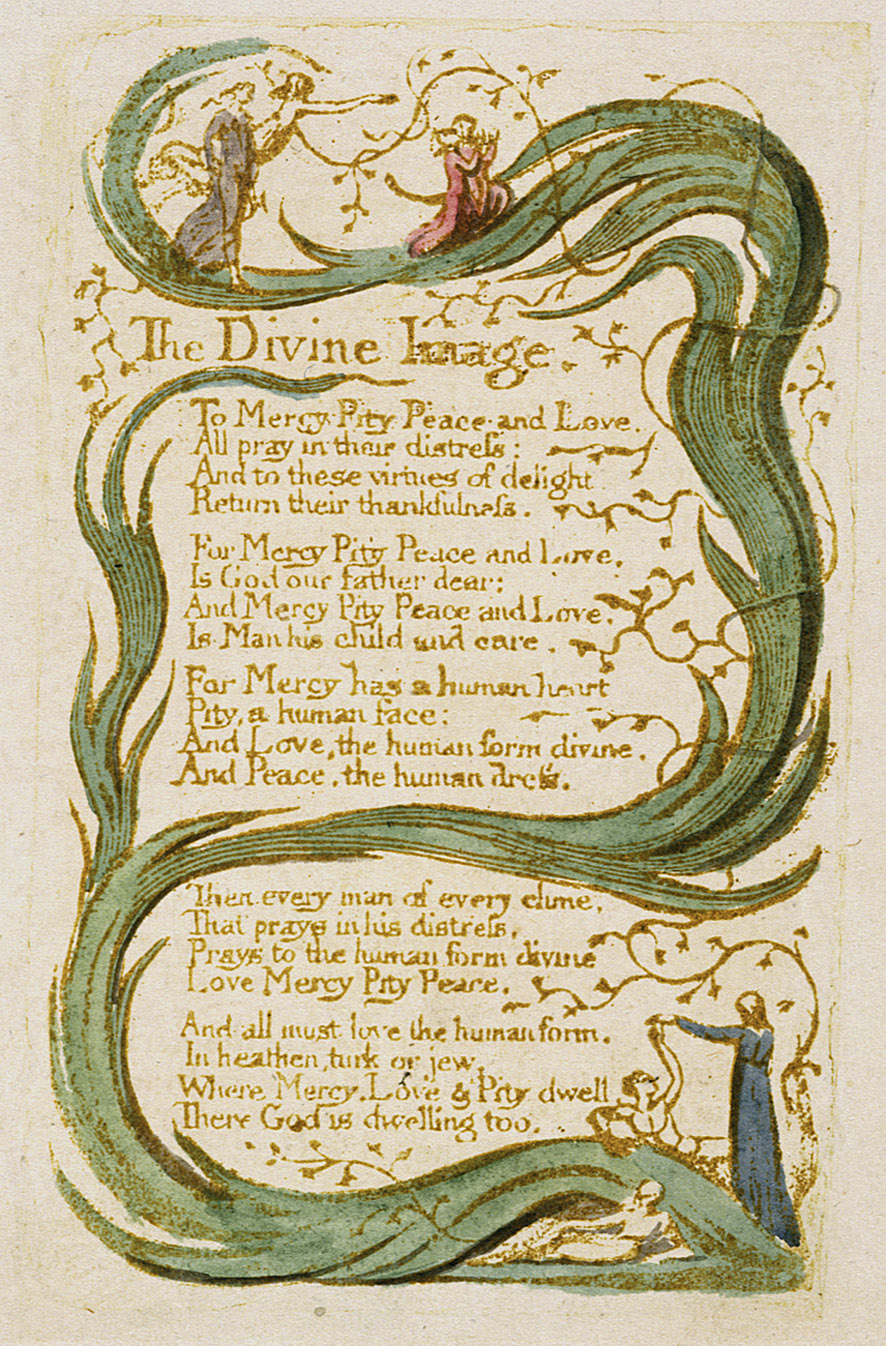
Copy G of The Divine Image held at the Yale Center for British Art and printed in 1789

"The Divine Image" is a poem by the English poet William Blake from his book Songs of Innocence (plate 18, 1789), not to be confused with "A Divine Image" from Songs of Experience (1794). It is a companion to "The Human Abstract" from the Songs of Experience, one of the three plates by Blake that were most successful (along with "The Blossom" and "Infant Joy").

== Poems ==
To Mercy Pity Peace and Love,
All pray in their distress:
And to these virtues of delight
Return their thankfulness.

For Mercy Pity Peace and Love,
Is God our father dear:
And Mercy Pity Peace and Love,
Is Man his child and care.

For Mercy has a human heart
Pity, a human face:
And Love, the human form divine,
And Peace, the human dress.

Then every man of every clime,
That prays in his distress,
Prays to the human form divine
Love Mercy Pity Peace.

And all must love the human form,
In heathen, turk or jew.
Where Mercy, Love & Pity dwell,
There God is dwelling too.

== Analysis ==
Aside from the basic observation that the poem reflects the biblical idea of men created by God in his own image (cf. Genesis 1:26–27), multiple interpretations are possible (E. P. Thompson appears to oppose the complexity: "It is a pity to argue about so transparent a poem").

The poem expresses straightforward didacticism, similar to the one in The Lamb, like a child repeating in a "singsong voice" the information they have just learned at the Sunday school without questioning who are the All mentioned in the second line. This is in a stark contrast with "The Human Abstract" that challenges the broad signifiers. A "less cynical" interpretation by Stephen C. Behrendt is that the speaker is using the abstractions to connect God, an entirely unknown entity to a familiar one, the Man. Yet another approach is to consider the poem to be a "bridge" into the "Songs of Experience" that deals with the death in the real world.

Stanley Gardner points to the idea of reconciliation through Christian compassion in "The Divine Image" stemming from its "cryptic expression" in "The Blossom".

As in many other Blake's poems, the voices here belong not to the individuals, but to the Blake's idea of "states" , the representatives of good and evil mixed within each man.

== Graphics ==
The plate, like "The Blossom" and "Infant Joy", includes flowering flames. Their restrained appearance signify the consolation and faith turning into a triumph. The visual appearance of "The Divine Image" and "The Blossom" is especially close, relating these texts in a unique fashion.

At the bottom of the plate, Christ, dressed in green, offers a helping hand to the naked and suffering mankind. At the top, kneeling children "pray in [...] distress", and an angel helps them by leading a woman, also in green gown, towards them.

== Theology ==
The poem is generally considered Swedenborgian, "the signature of the New Jerusalem Church" with its doctrine of divine humanity ("Christ is God"). Unlike both Unitarianism and Trinitarianism, the doctrine declared that God infused His own life into Christ via the "divine influx", so the Trinity exists, but within one person. Thompson, however, argues that the poem is, actually, anti-Swedenborgian, as the very first verse apparently refutes Swedenborg's statement that "[w]ith Respect to God it is not possible that he can love and be reciprocally loved".

== Musical settings ==
The poem has been set to music several times by different composers:

- In Five Songs from William Blake (1951) by Virgil Thomson
- In Ten Blake Songs (1957) by Ralph Vaughan Williams
- In Jazz Songs of Innocence (2012) by Bob Chilcott
- In "Songs of Innocence and Experience" by William Bolcolm. The 2004 recording won four Grammy Awards.
- In the album Heathen & Heaven (2025), by the band {Blake}

== Sources ==
- Freeman, Kathryn S. (1 December 2016). "The Divine Image". A Guide to the Cosmology of William Blake. Taylor & Francis. pp. 89–90. ISBN 978-1-317-18808-7.
- Pearce, Joseph; Asch, Robert (15 June 2015). "The Divine Image". The Romantic Poets Blake, Wordsworth and Coleridge: Ignatius Critical Editions. Ignatius Press. p. 2. ISBN 978-1-58617-264-0.
- Gardner, Stanley (1986). Blake's 'Innocence' and 'Experience' Retraced. A&C Black. ISBN 978-1-4725-1013-6.
- Thompson, E.P. (15 July 2014). "The Divine Image". In Lucas, John (ed.). William Blake. Routledge. pp. 27–42. ISBN 978-1-317-89204-5.
- Gillham, Bill (2 January 1966). Blake's Contrary States: The 'Songs of Innocence and Experience' as Dramatic Poems. Cambridge University Press. ISBN 978-0-521-05083-8.
- Bottrall, Margaret (1950). The Divine Image: A Study of Blake's Interpretation of Christianity. Ed. di Storia e Letteratura.
- Smith, David J. (1967). "Blake's 'The Divine Image'". Explicator. Apr., XXV (69). ISSN 0014-4940.
- Law, Philip (1986). "Innocence Renewed: The Divine Images of Songs of Innocence and of Experience". Theology. 89 (730): 275–282. doi:10.1177/0040571X8608900405. ISSN 0040-571X.
