= Notebook of William Blake =

Manuscript

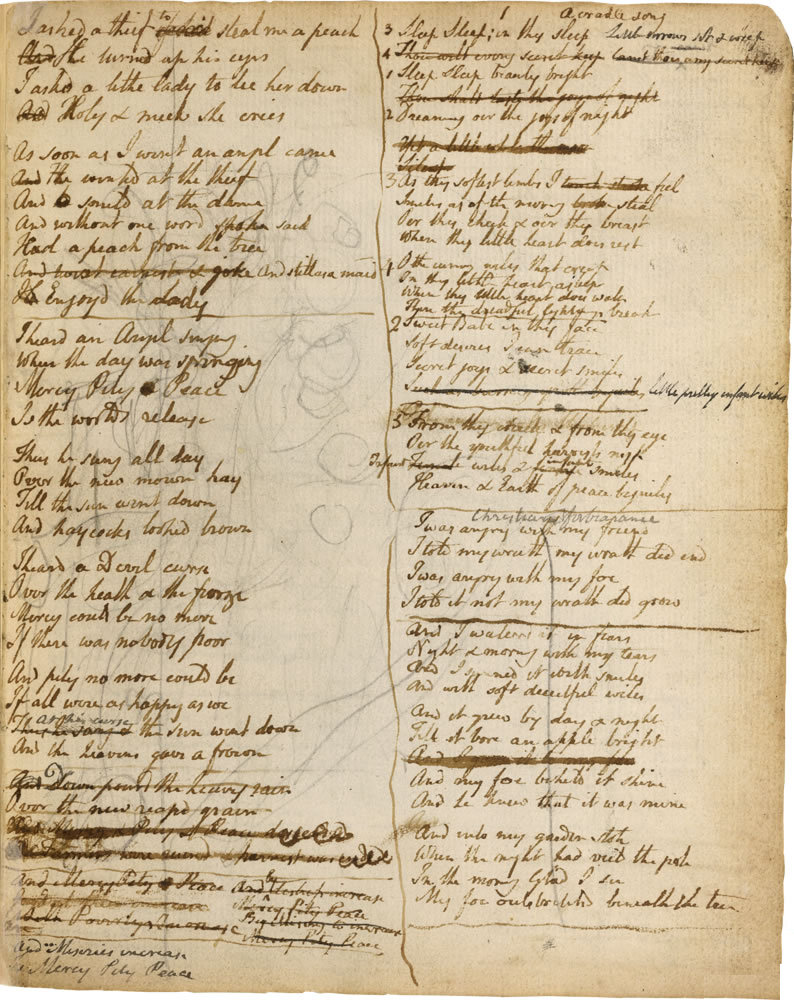
Notebook, p 114 rev, contains ""I asked a thief to steal me a peach…", "I heard an Angel singing…", A Cradle Song (Blake, 1794) and Christian Forbearance (the draft of "A Poison Tree")

The Notebook of William Blake (also known as the Rossetti Manuscript from its association with its former owner Dante Gabriel Rossetti) was used by William Blake as a commonplace book from c. 1787 (or 1793) to 1818.

== Description ==
The Notebook [Butlin #201] consists of 58 leaves and contains autograph drafts by Blake of poems and prose with numerous sketches and designs, mostly in pencil. Containing two pages of preface, alongside 94 pages of sketches, each page is approximately 159 x 197mm. The original leaves were later bound with a partial copy (ff. 62–94) of 'All that is of any value in the foregoing pages' that is Rossettis' transcription of Blake's notebook (added after 1847).

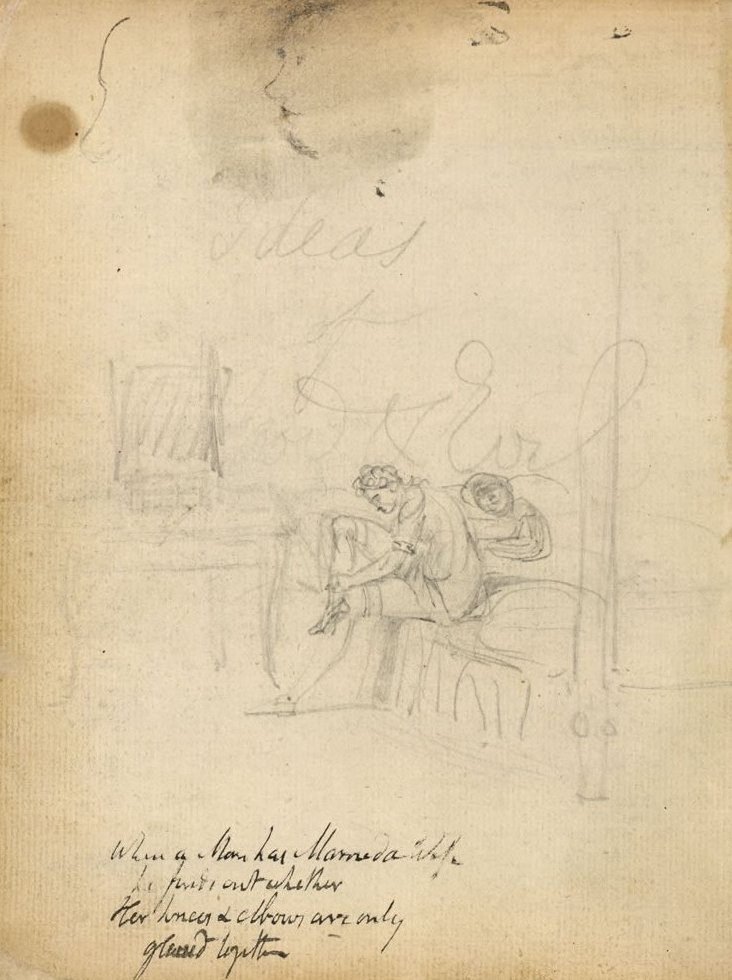
Ideas of Good & Evil, p.4

== Ideas of Good and Evil ==
At first the Notebook belonged to Blake's favourite younger brother and pupil Robert who made a few pencil sketches and ink-and-wash drawings in it. After death of Robert in February 1787, Blake inherited the volume beginning it with the series of sketches for many emblematic designs on a theme of life of a man from his birth to death. Then, reversing the book he wrote on its last pages a series of poems of c. 1793. He continued the book in 1800s returning to the first pages. All together the Notebook contains about 170 poems plus fragments of prose: Memoranda (1807), Draft for Prospectus of the Engraving of Chaucer's Canterbury Pilgrims (1809), Public Address (1810), A Vision of the Last Judgment (1810). The latest work in the Notebook is a long and elaborated but unfinished poem The Everlasting Gospel dated c. 1818.

On the page 4 is placed a short humorous poem "When a Man has Married a Wife..." and a picture above showing of a man and woman rising from bed in a sparsely furnished room that could be Blake's own. The line of text obscured by the picture "Ideas of Good & Evil" served probably as a title to 64 following picture emblems, 17 of which were used for the book "For Children: The Gates of Paradise". D. G. Rossetti, A. C. Swinburne, and W. B. Yeats in their publications of Blake's poetry used this as a title for the series of poems from the manuscripts. In 1905 John Sampson issued the first annotated publication of all these poems and created a detailed descriptive Index to 'The Rossettt MS.'. It follows by some other scholarly publications edited by Geoffrey Keynes (1935 & 1957/66), David V. Erdman (1965/82/88) & together with D. K. Moore (1977), Alicia Ostriker (1977), Gerald E. Bentley Jr. (1977), etc.

In the introduction of his publication D. G. Rossetti gave to these poems a following presentation:

"The shorter poems, and even the fragments, afford many instances of that exquisite metrical gift and rightness in point of form which constitute Blake's special glory among his contemporaries, even more eminently perhaps than the grander command of mental resources which is also his. Such qualities of pure perfection in writing verse, as he perpetually, without effort, displayed, are to be met with among those elder poets whom he loved, and such again are now looked upon as the peculiar trophies of a school which has arisen since his time; but he alone (let it be repeated and remembered) possessed them then, and possessed them in clear completeness. Colour and metre, these are the true patents of nobility in painting and poetry, taking precedence of all intellectual claims; and it is by virtue of these, first of all, that Blake holds, in both arts, a rank which cannot be taken from him."

== Poems of 1793 ==
The section of c. 1793 contains 63 poems that include drafts versions of 16 poems entered the collection of Songs of Experience, which have been placed here in the following order:

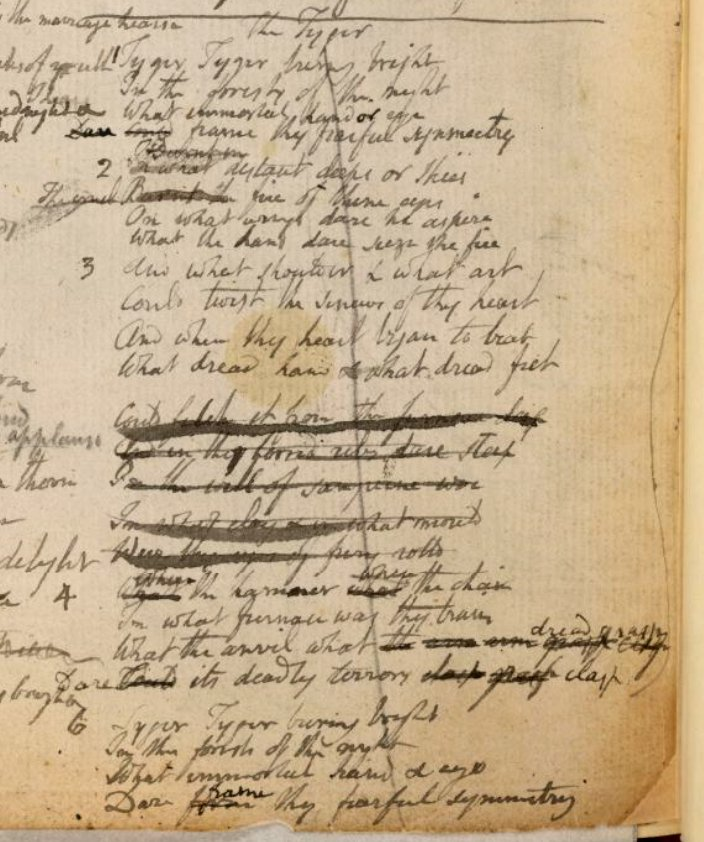
"The Tyger (1st draft)", p. 109

Poems and fragments from the Note-book	Pages:	See related texts in the Songs of Experience:
Written about 1793 (numbering from ed. Jeoffrey Keynes, 1957/66)
1. "A flower was offer'd to me…"	p.115 reversed	"My Pretty Rose Tree"
3. "Love seeketh not itself to please…"	p.115 rev	"The Clod and the Pebble"
5. "I went to the garden of love…"	p.115 rev	"The Garden of Love"
8. "I heard an Angel singing…"	p.114 rev	"The Human Abstract"
10. Christian Forbearance	p.114 rev	"A Poison Tree"
13. Infant Sorrow	p.113 rev	"Infant Sorrow"
17. Earth's Answer	p.111 rev	"Earth's Answer"
19. London	p.109 rev	"London"
23. "When the voices of children are heard on the green…"	p.109 rev	"Nurse's Song"
25. The Tyger (1st draft)	pp.109–108 rev	"The Tyger"
26. The Tyger (2nd draft)	p.108 rev	"The Tyger"
28. The human Image	p.107 rev	"The Human Abstract"
31. The sick rose	p.107 rev	"The Sick Rose"
45. The little Vagabond	p.105 rev	"The Little Vagabond"
47. The Chimney Sweeper	pp.105 & 103 rev	"The Chimney Sweeper"
51. Holy Thursday	p. 103 rev	"Holy Thursday"
52. The Angel	p. 103 rev	"The Angel"
55. "Little fly…"	p. 101 rev	"The Fly"

Some of these drafts are significantly different from their last versions, for example "Infant Sorrow" of the Notebook is much more expanded and composed of nine quatrains instead of two that were chosen for the Songs of Experience. Also it is interesting to compare the most famous Blake's poem "The Tyger" with its two earlier Notebook versions (see: "The Tyger", 1st draft and 2nd draft).

The genre of most of the poems of this section can be defined as Songs and Ballads. Some of them reflect the political and social climate of that time:

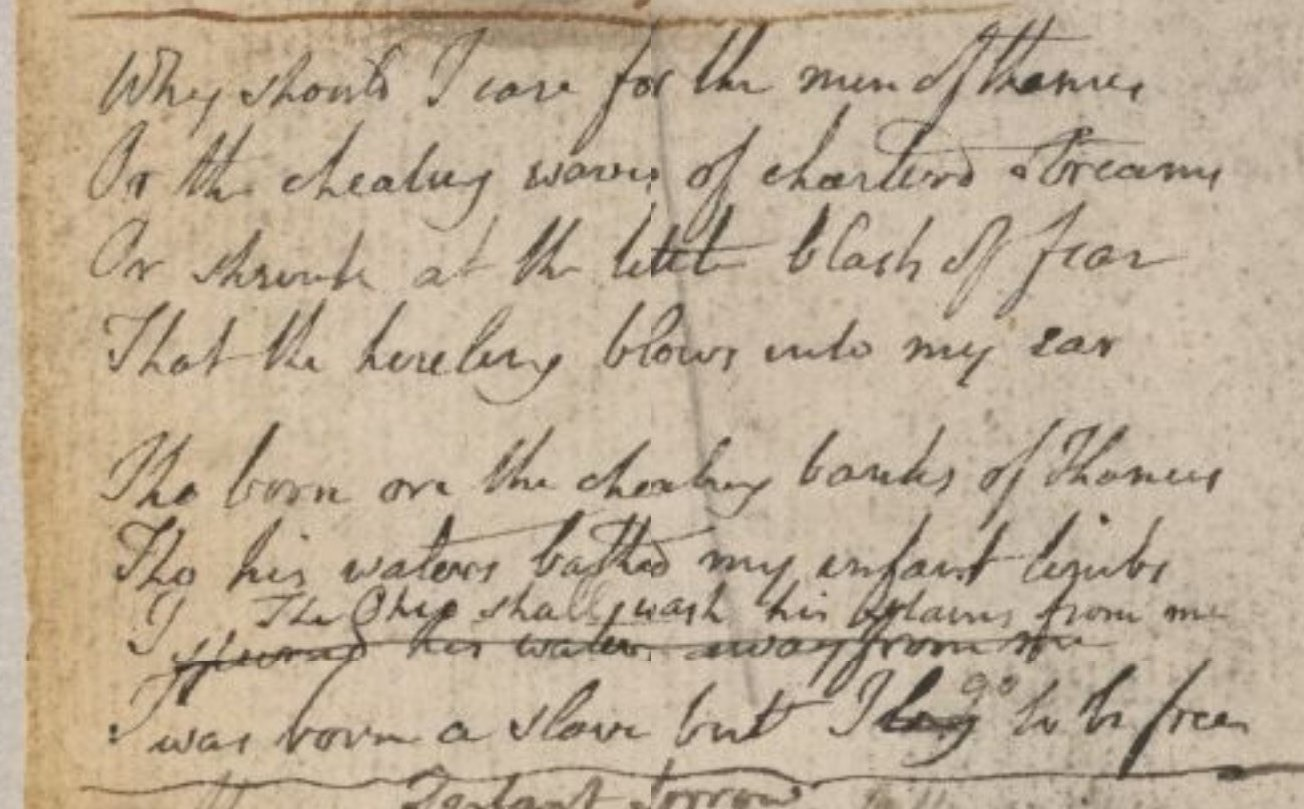
"Why should I care for the men of Thames...", p. 113 rev

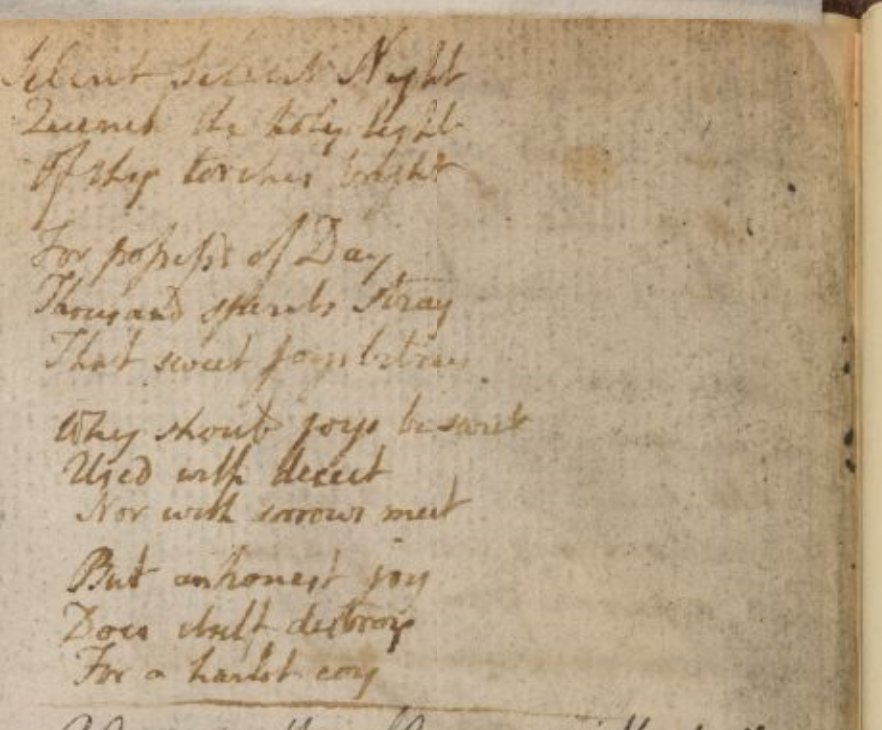
"Silent, Silent Night...", p. 113 rev

✶✶✶

Why should I care for the men of thames
Or the cheating waves of charterd streams
Or shrink at the little blasts of fear
That the hireling blows into my ear

Tho born on the cheating banks of Thames
Tho his waters bathed my infant limbs
The Ohio shall wash his stains from me
I was born a slave but I go to be free

✶✶✶

Silent Silent Night
Quench the holy light
Of thy torches bright

For possessd of Day
Thousand spirits stray
That sweet joys betray

Why should joys be sweet
Used with deceit
Nor with sorrows meet

But an honest joy
Does itself destroy
For a harlot coy

Some other of these poems rather belong to the genre of Satiric verses and epigrams, like the following:

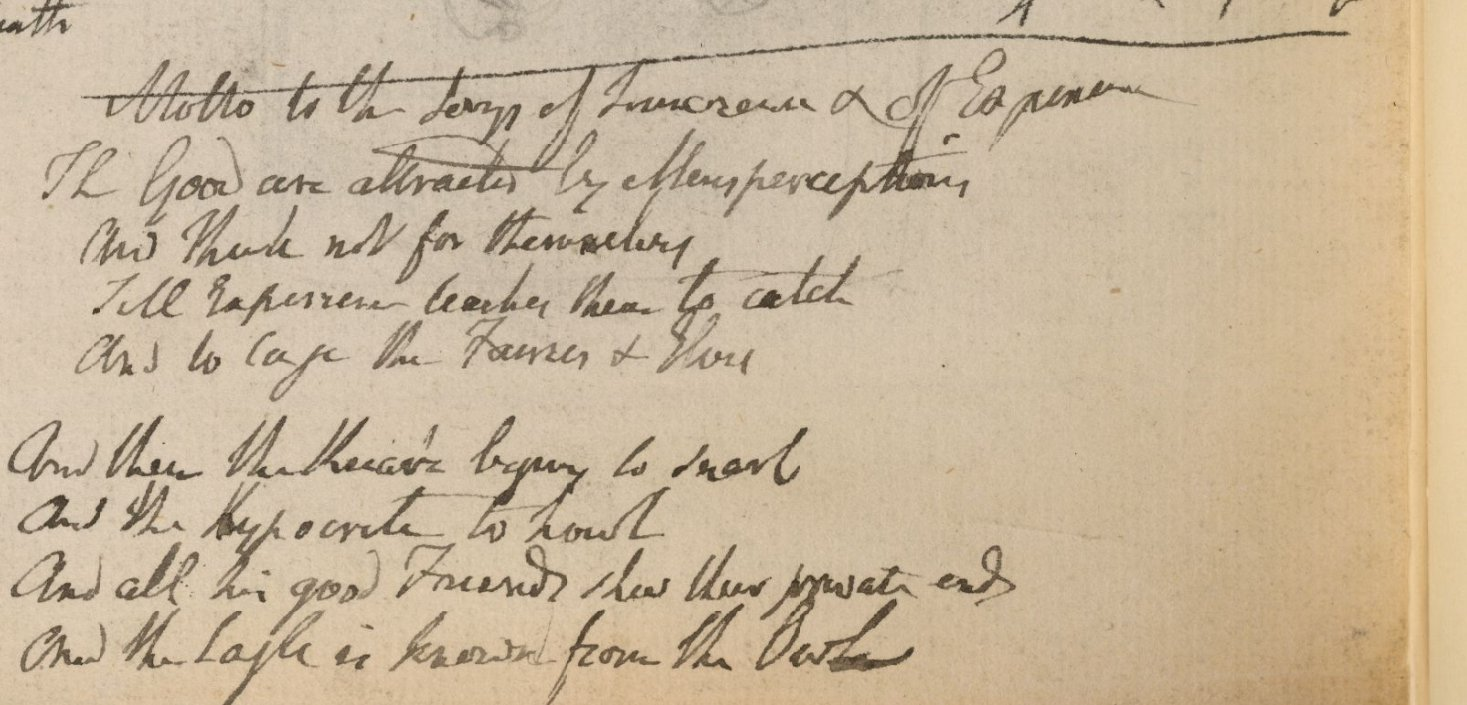
Motto to the Songs of Innocence and of Experience, p. 101 rev

Motto to the Songs of Innocence and of Experience

The Good are attracted by Mens perceptions
And Think not for themselves
Till Experience teaches them to catch
And to cage the Fairies and Elves

And then the Knave begins to snarl
And the Hypocrite to howl
And all his good Friends shew their private ends
And the Eagle is known from the Owl

This motto, which was never engraved by Blake, is not found in any copy of the Songs of Innocence and of Experience.

== Poems of 1800–1803 ==
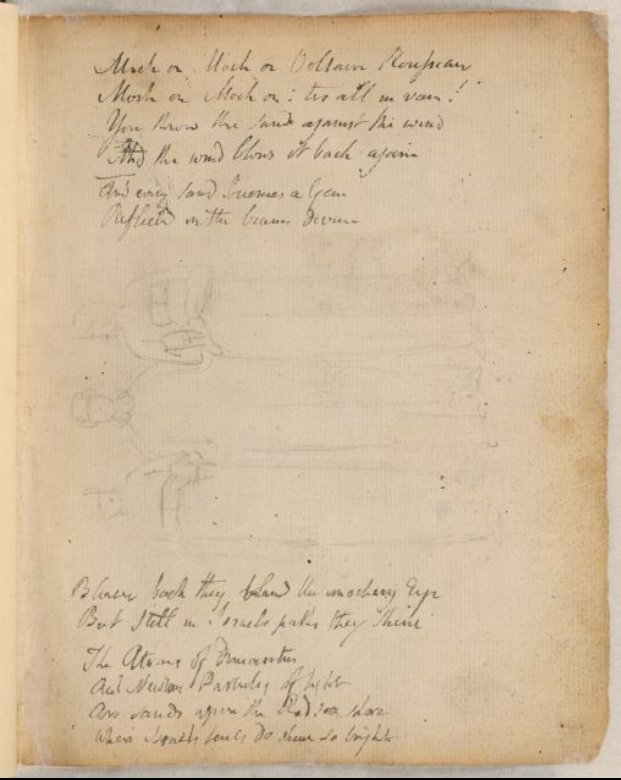
Mock on, Mock on, Voltaire, Rousseau, p.7

There are 10 poems in the Notebook written during Blake's life in Felpham, a village in West Sussex. Here is the one of his most characteristic poems of that period:

✶✶✶

Mock on Mock on Voltaire Rousseau
Mock on Mock on! tis all in vain!
You throw the sand against the wind
And the wind blows it back again

And every sand becomes a Gem
Reflected in the beams divine
Blown back they blind the mocking Eye
But still in Israels paths they shine

The Atoms of Democritus
And Newtons Particles of light
Are sands upon the Red sea shore
Where Israels tents do shine so bright

== Poems of 1808–1811 ==
The most of 92 texts of this section are epigrams, gnomic verses or fragments addressed to Blake's friends and enemies, to painters and poets as well as some different historical or mythological characters and even to God. Here are typical examples:

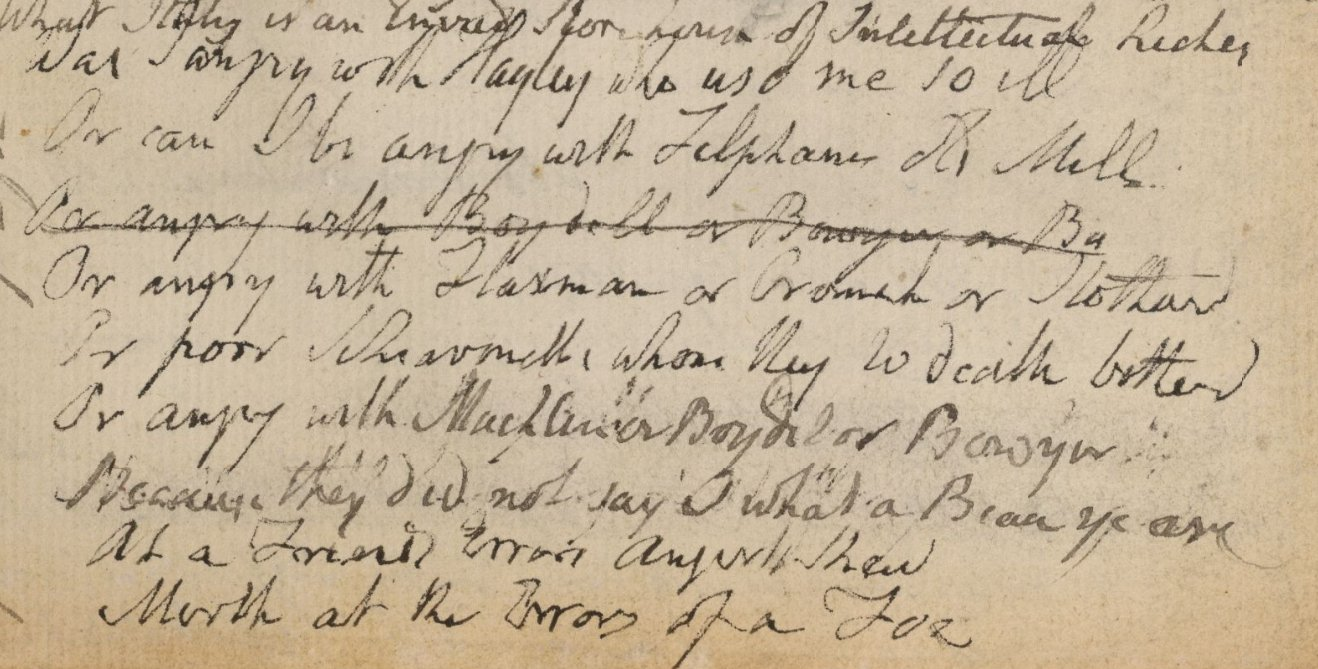
"Was I angry with Hayley who us'd me so ill...", p. 23

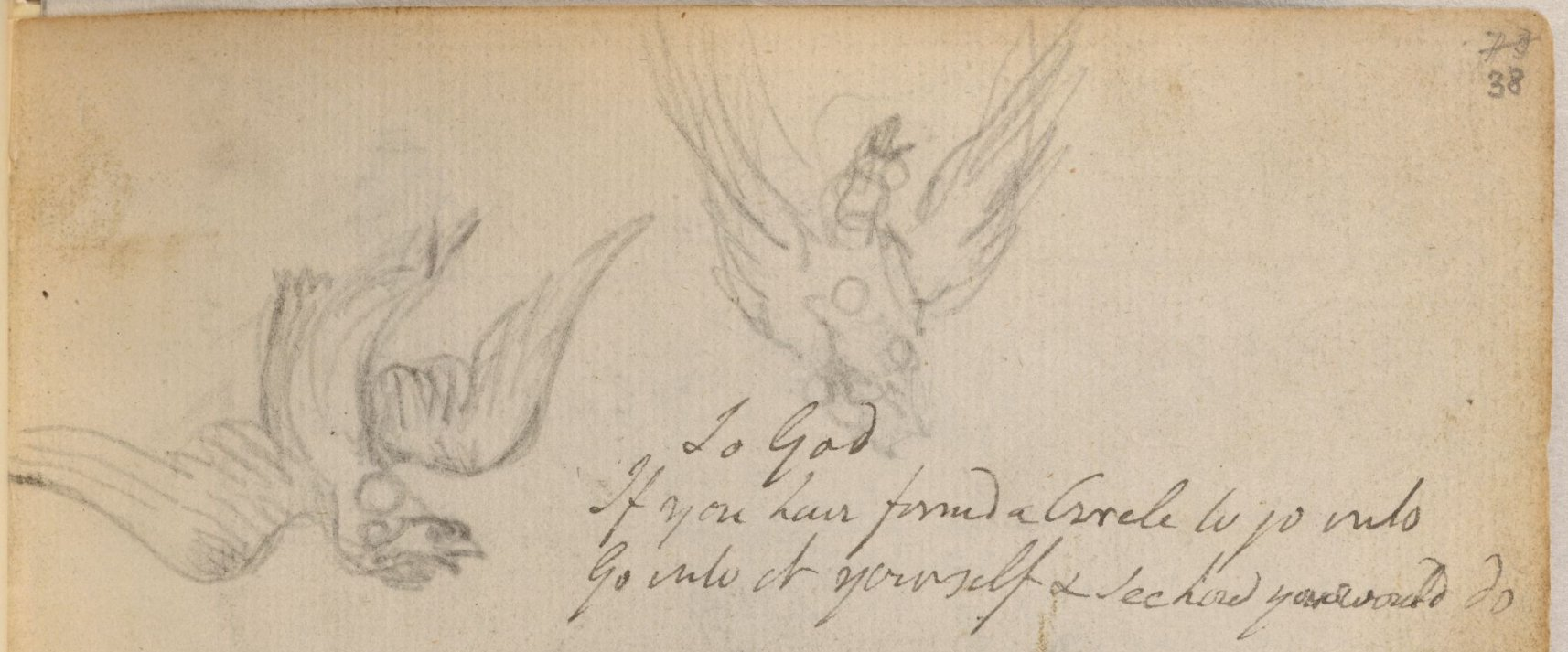
"To God", p. 73

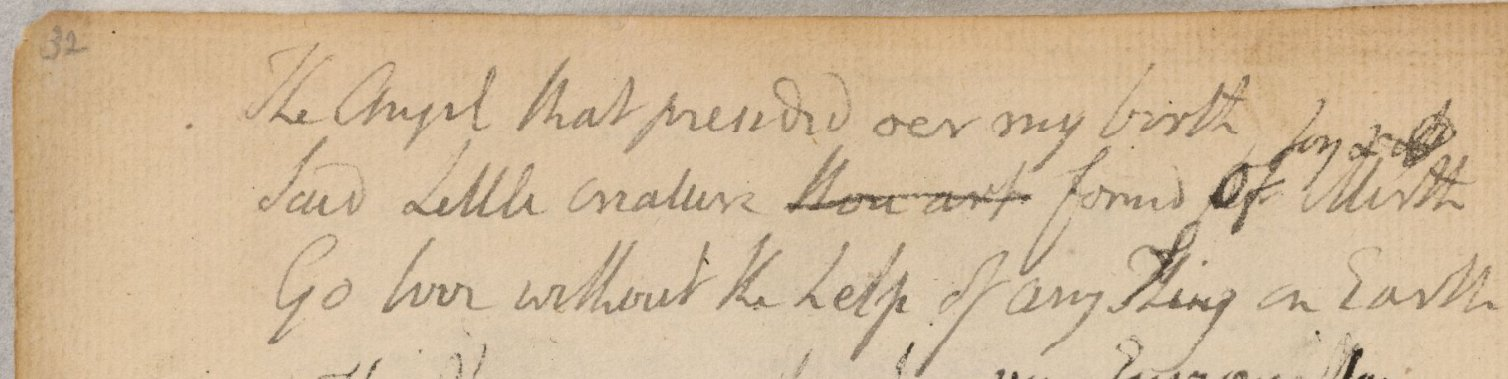
"The Angel that presided o'er my birth...", p. 32

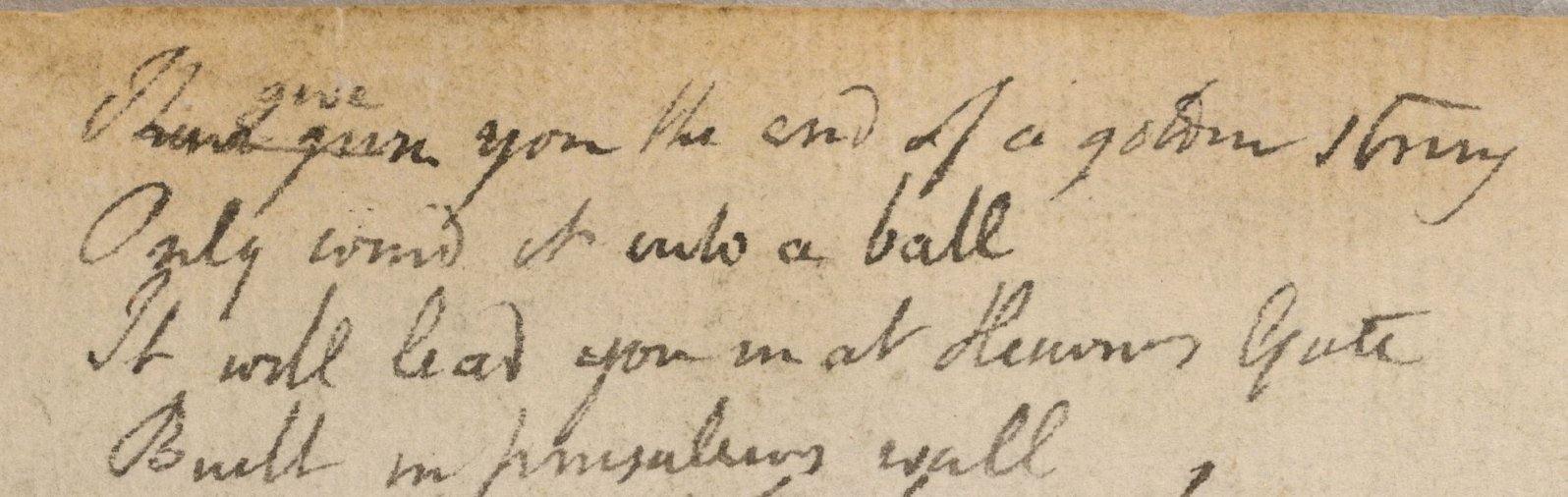
""I give you the end of a golden string...", p. 46

✶✶✶

Was I angry with Hayley who usd me so ill
Or can I be angry with Felphams old Mill
Or angry with Flaxman or Cromek or Stothard
Or poor Schiavonetti whom they to death botherd
Or angry with Macklin or Boydel or Bowyer
Because they did not say O what a Beau ye are
At a Friends Errors Anger shew
Mirth at the Errors of a Foe

To God

If you have formd a Circle to go into
Go into it yourself & see how you would do

In the following short fragment Blake speaks of himself and his own spiritual experience in his babyhood:

✶✶✶

The Angel that presided oer my birth
Said Little creature formd of Joy & Mirth
Go love without the help of any King on Earth

There is also a draft of famous Blake's motto from his poem Jerusalem The Emanation of the Giant Albion:

✶✶✶

I give you the end of a golden string,
Only wind it into a ball:
It will lead you in at Heavens gate,
Built in Jerusalems wall.

But there in "Jerusalem" at the beginning of the chapter 4 ("To the Christians") it is given in a combination with other 4 mysterious lines:

Devils are	I give you the end of a golden string,
False Religions	Only wind it into a ball:
"Saul Saul"	It will lead you in at Heavens gate,
"Why persecutest thou me."	Built in Jerusalems wall.

== Designs ==
The Notebook is full of Blake's sketches and designs almost on every page. Here is the index of the first 25 pages (see illustrations below):

p. 2.	Sketch (pencil). — Daphne? (central emblem).
p. 4.	Title-page. — Ideas of Good & Evil. Sketch (pencil). — A young woman dressing (central emblem).
p. 5.	Sketch. (pen and ink) A man in a Roman toga
p. 6.	Sketch (pen and ink) Tiger. Tiger's head. A man hiding in a house. For the Designs to a Series of Ballads of William Hayley
p. 7.	Sketch (pencil). Three figures
p. 8.	Sketch (pencil). A composition with 2 or 3 figures
p. 9.	Sketch (sepia). attrib. to Robert Blake: "Lady Macduff fleeing one of Macbeth's henchmen"
p. 11.	Sketch (pencil). A composition with a few figures
p. 12.	Sketch (pencil). Head of a King? (obscured with the text, central emblem).
p. 13.	Sketch (sepia). attrib. to Robert Blake: Oberon and Titania Reclining on a Poppy (ill. to Shakespeare's A Midsummer Night's Dream?), Monochrome wash drawing,
p. 15.	Sketch (pencil). For Gates of Paradise. Traveller (central emblem). The urinating man. Flying monster with a man in his mouth (3 times) — Lucifer discovering Judas? (Inferno, Canto xxxiv.). A man with a dog.
p. 16.	Sketch (pencil). Flying monster with a man in his mouth (twice) — Lucifer discovering Judas? (Inferno, Canto xxxiv.). A man. A figure with children.
p. 17.	Sketch (pencil) Monster's Head with a man in his mouth (twice). Old man encounters his death (central emblem).
p. 18.	Sketch (pencil). A horseman with a lady following (central emblem).
p. 19.	Sketch (pencil). — For Gates of Paradise. Object 9: What are these? Alas! the Female Martyr Is She also the Divine Image (central emblem).
p. 20.	Sketch (pencil). Dispute (central emblem).
p. 21.	Sketch.— For Songs of Experience — 'The Sick Rose.' (central emblem, pencil). Man's head in profile (pen and ink).
p. 22.	Sketch (pencil). A composition with a few figures (heavily obscured with the text, central emblem).
p. 23.	Sketch (pencil). A figure inside of the cage hanged on the bow of a tree and anEagle (central emblem).
p. 24.	Sketch (pencil). A composition with 3 figures (central emblem).
p. 25.	Sketch (pencil). A composition with 5 figures – Pestilence? (central emblem).

... and so on.

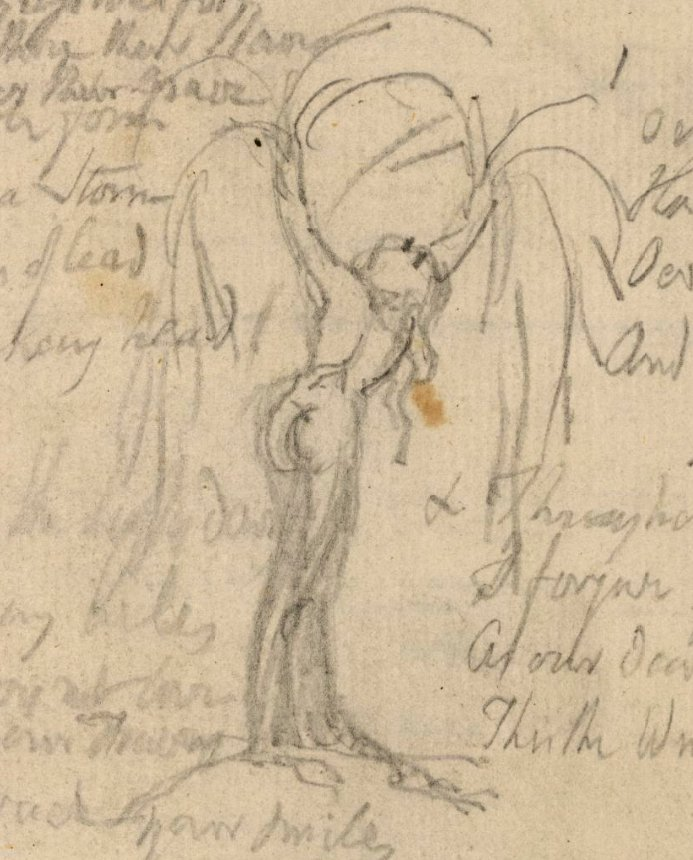
Daphna? p.2

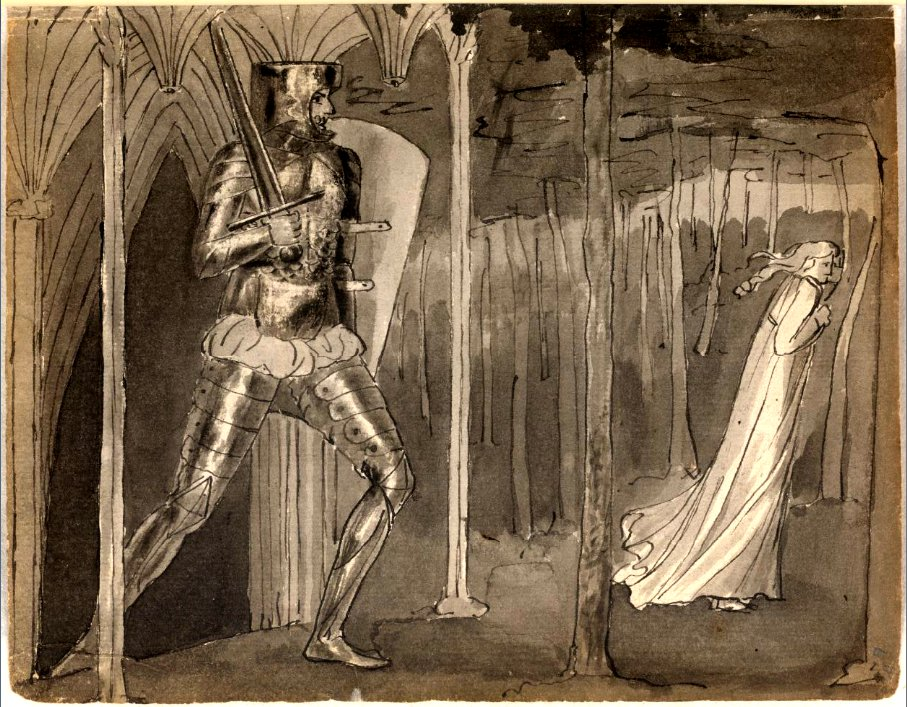
attrib. to Robert Blake: "Lady Macduff fleeing one of Macbeth's henchmen", p.9

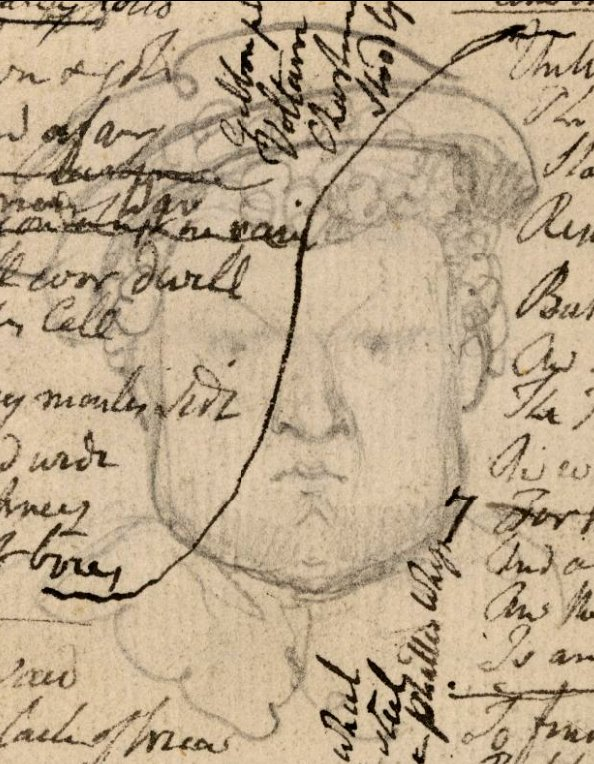
Head of a King? p.12

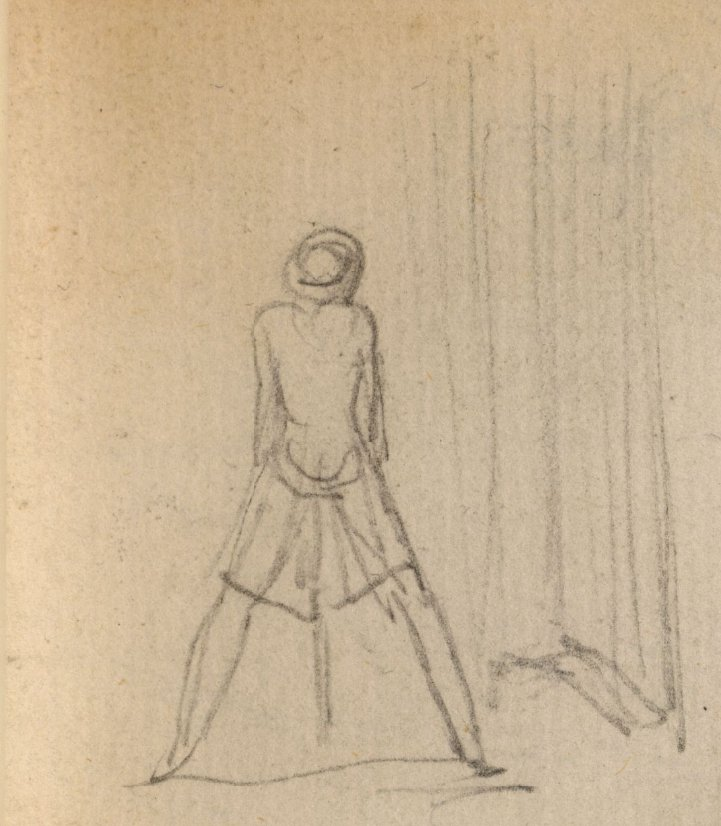
Urinating man, p.15

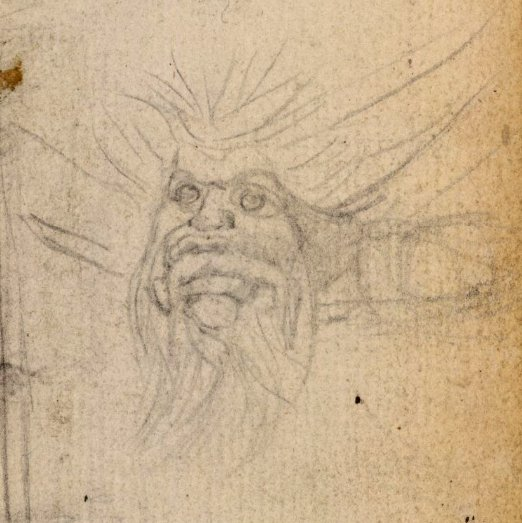
Flying Monster, p.15

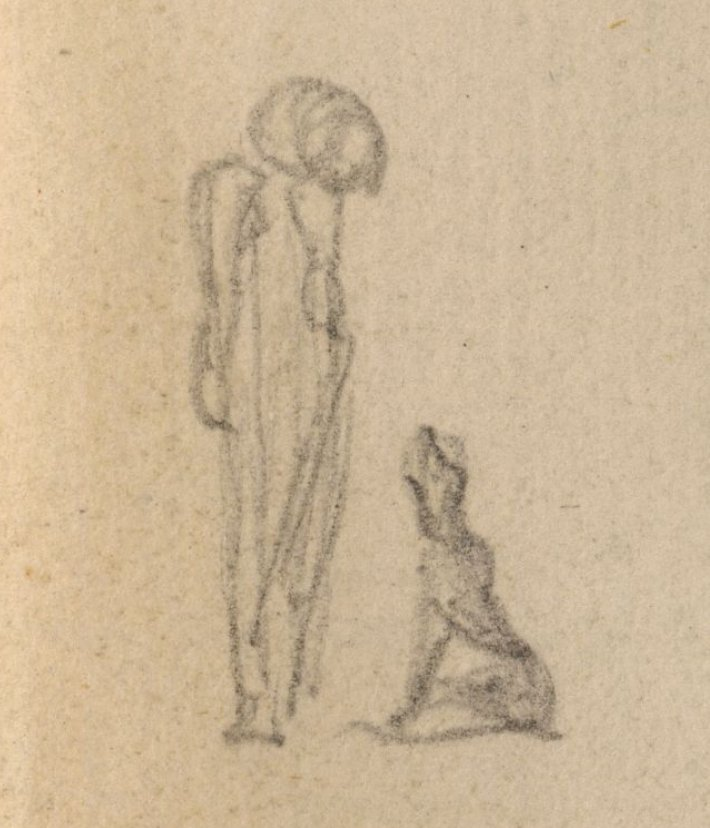
Man & Dog, p.15

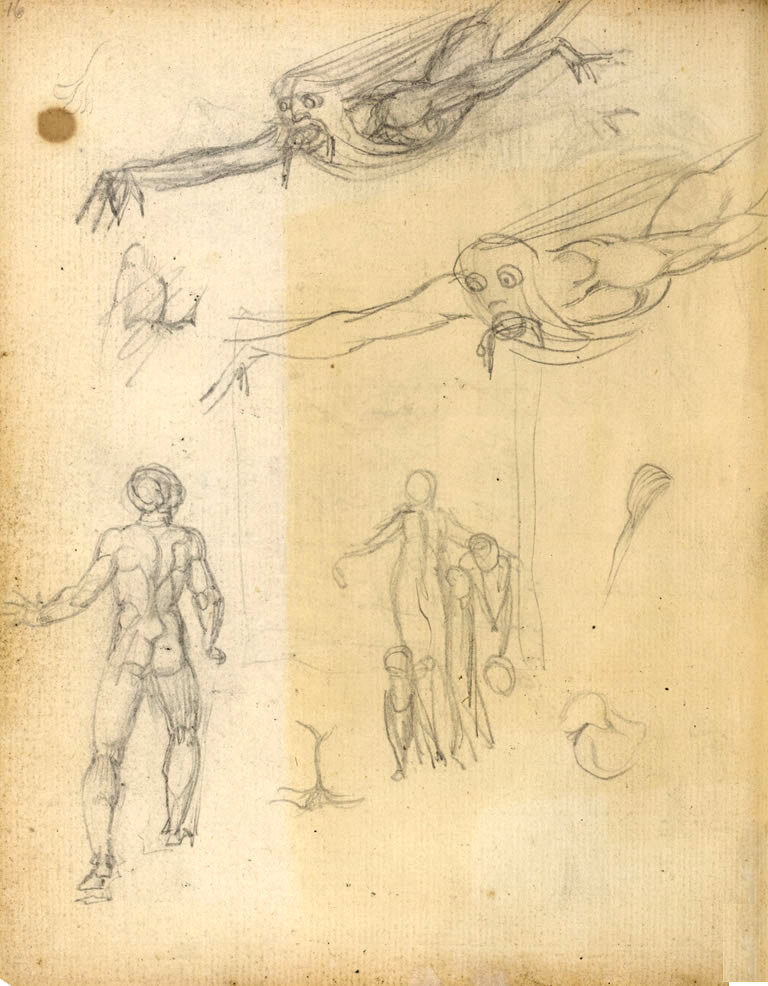
Flying Monsters & Traveller, p.16

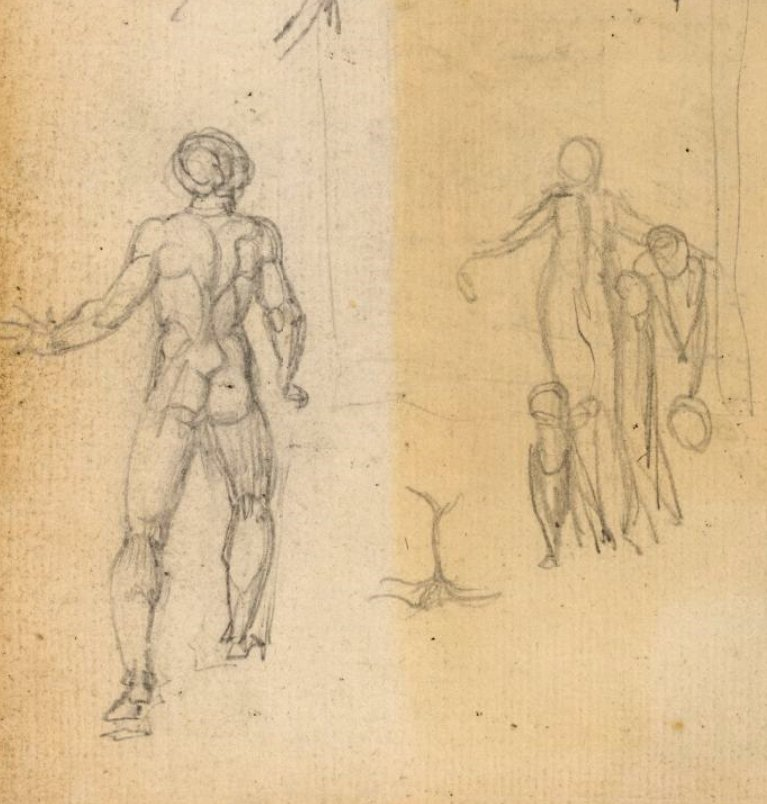
Traveller and Woman with children, p.16

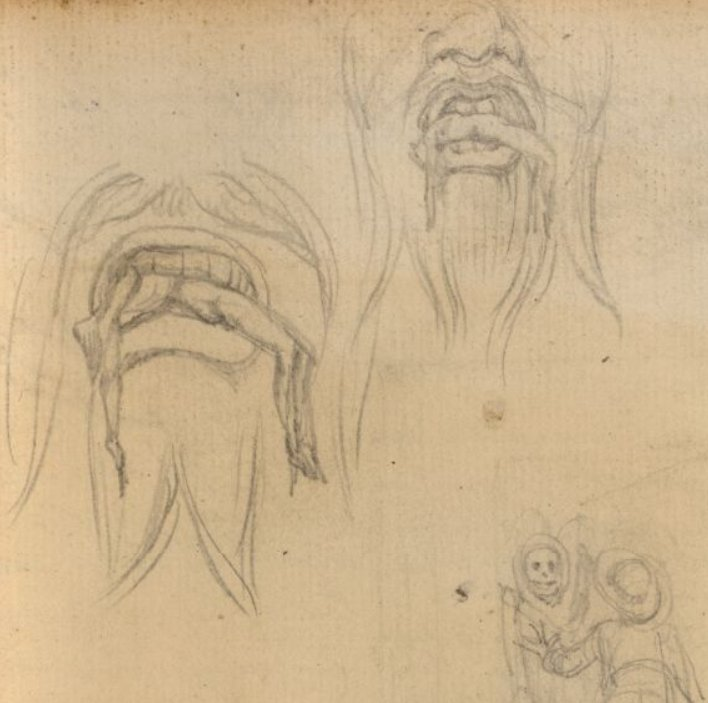
Two Monsters, p.17

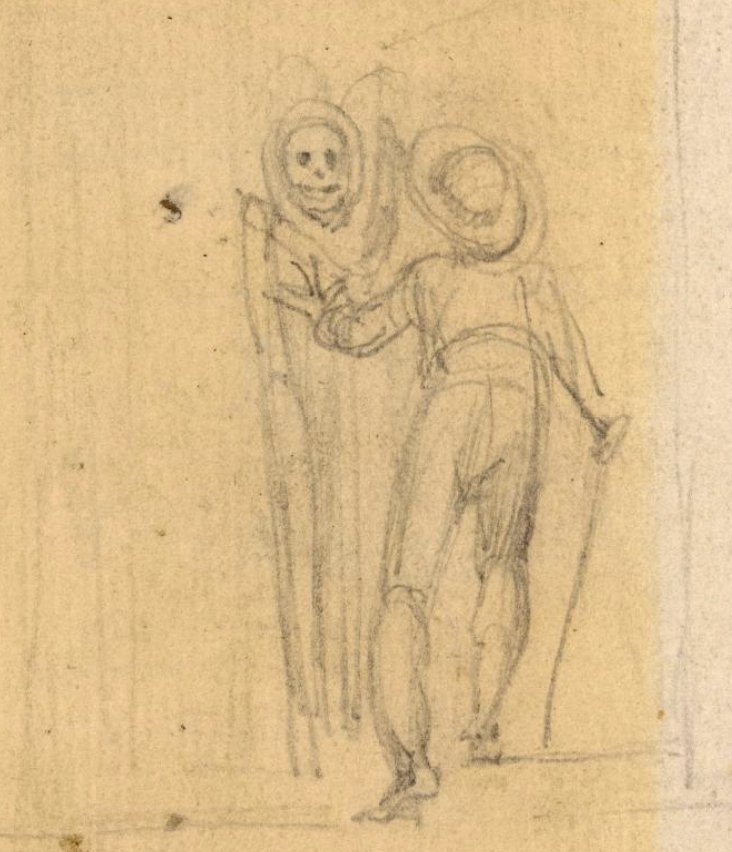
Encounter with Death, p.17

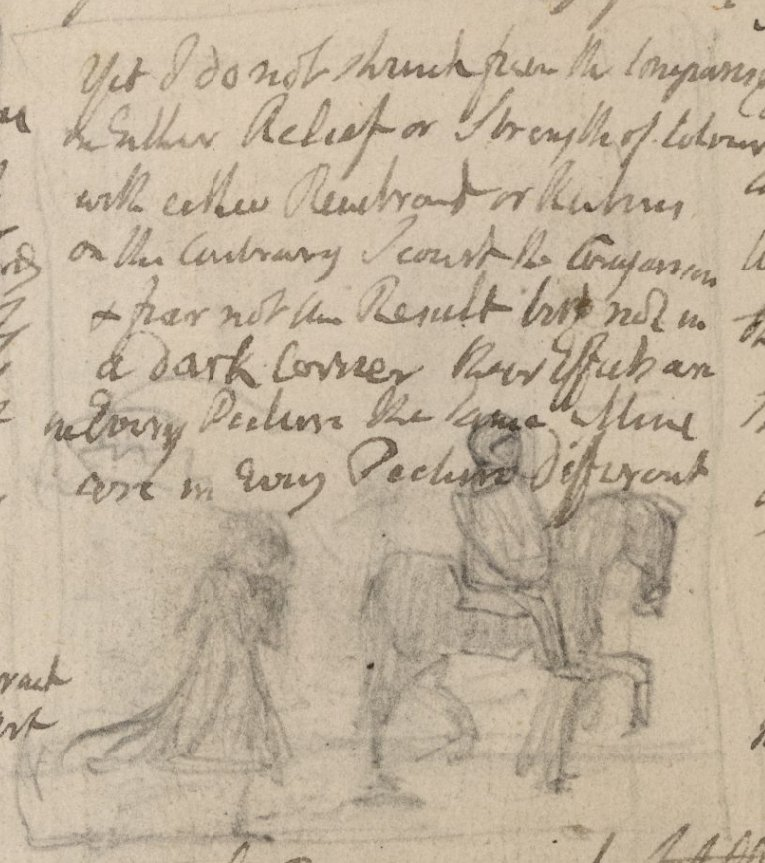
Horseman, p.18

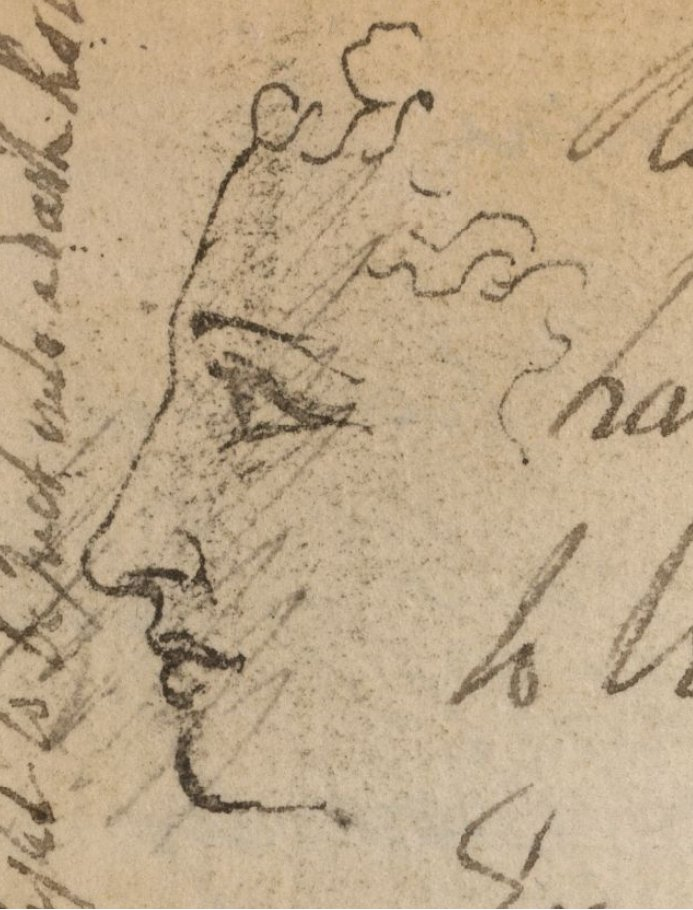
Woman's Head, p.19

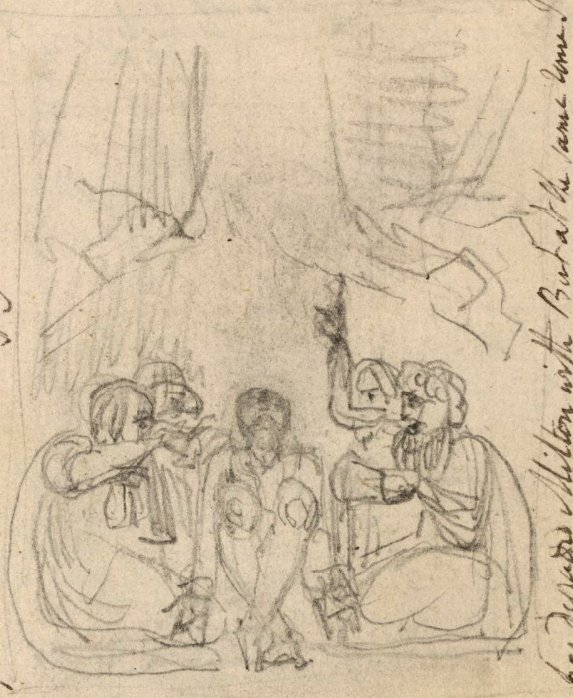
Dispute, p.20

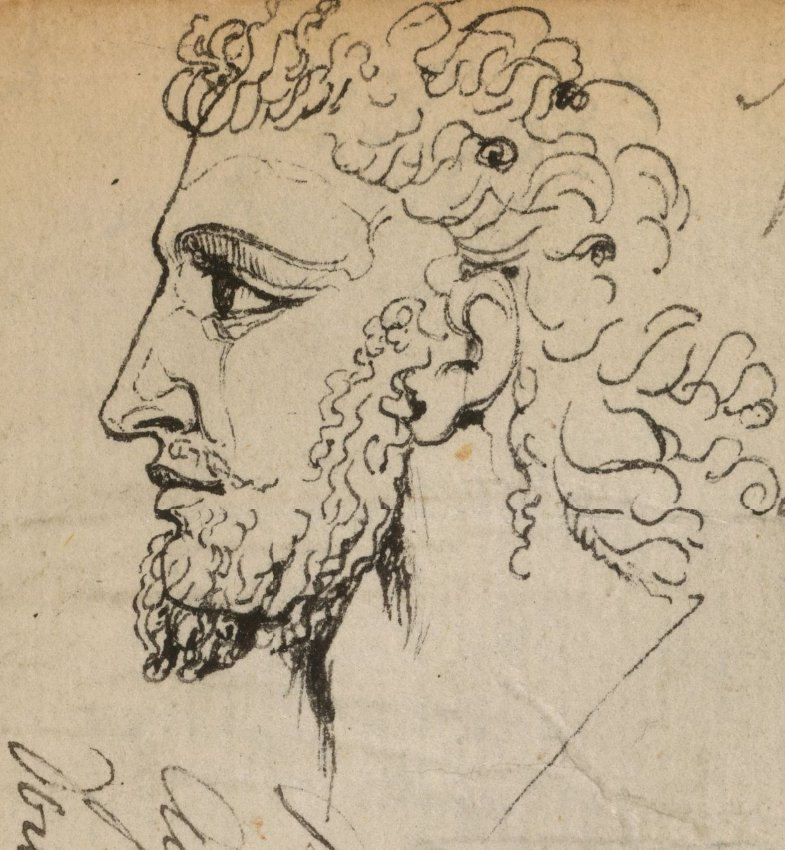
Man's Head, p.21

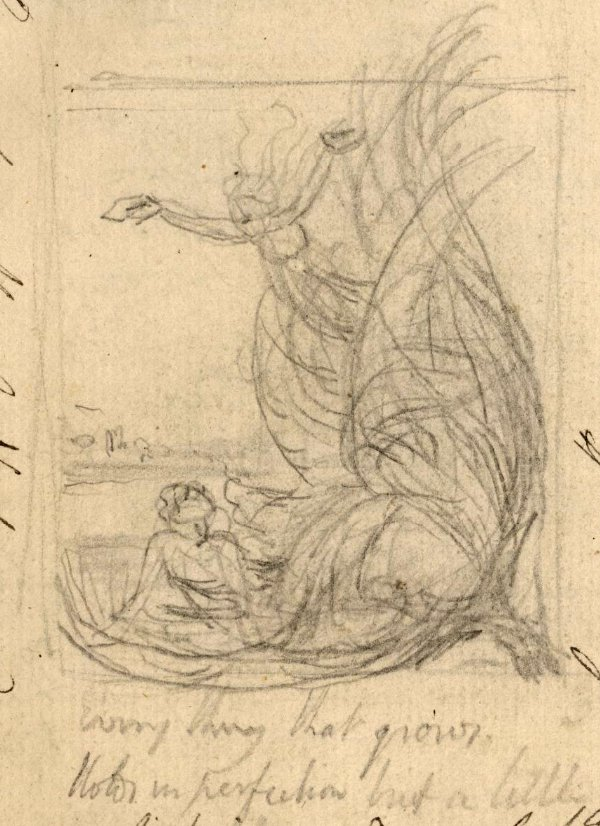
The Sick Rose, p.21

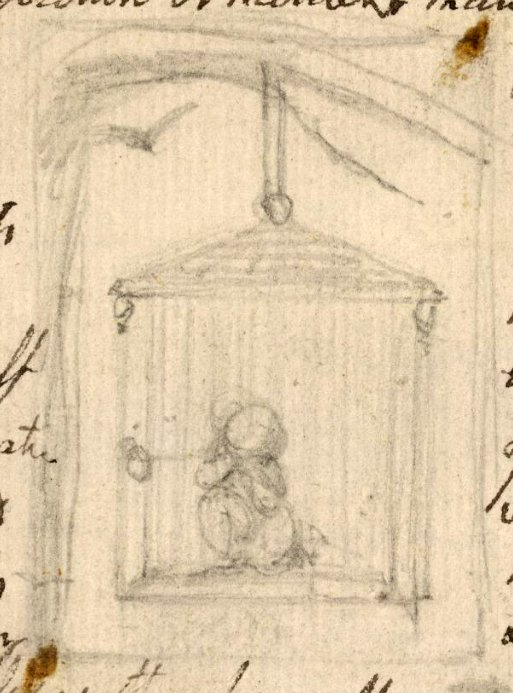
Cage on a tree, p.23

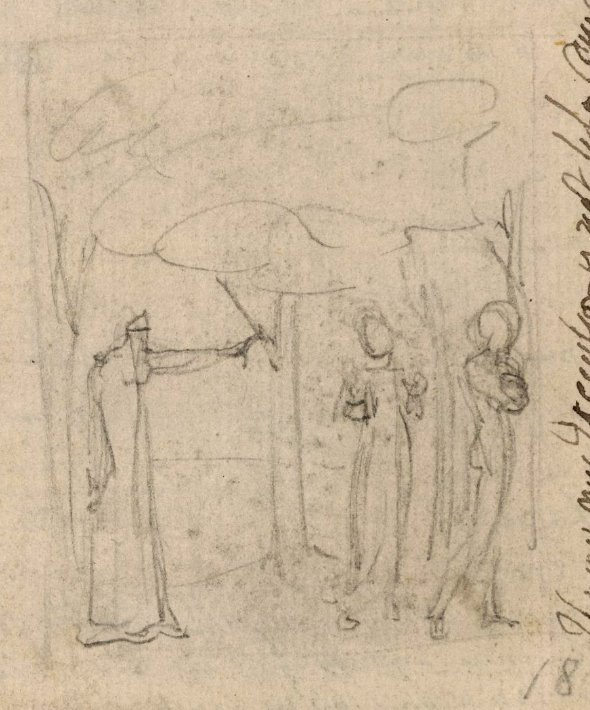
Scene, p.24

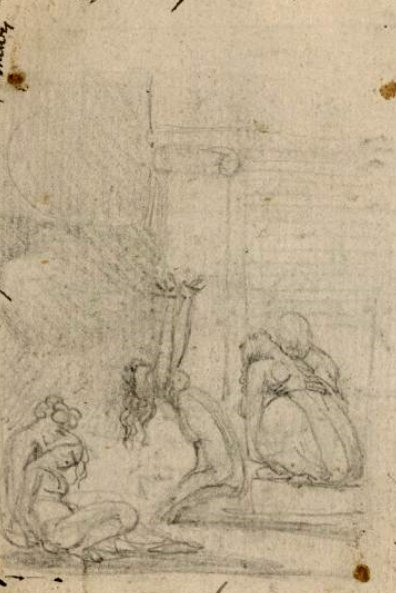
Pestilence? p.25

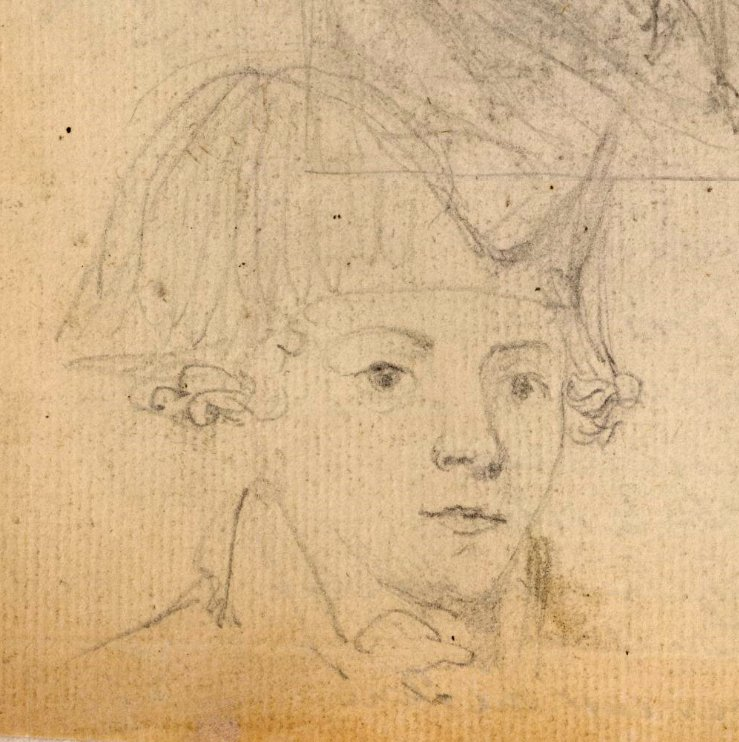
Portrait, p.47

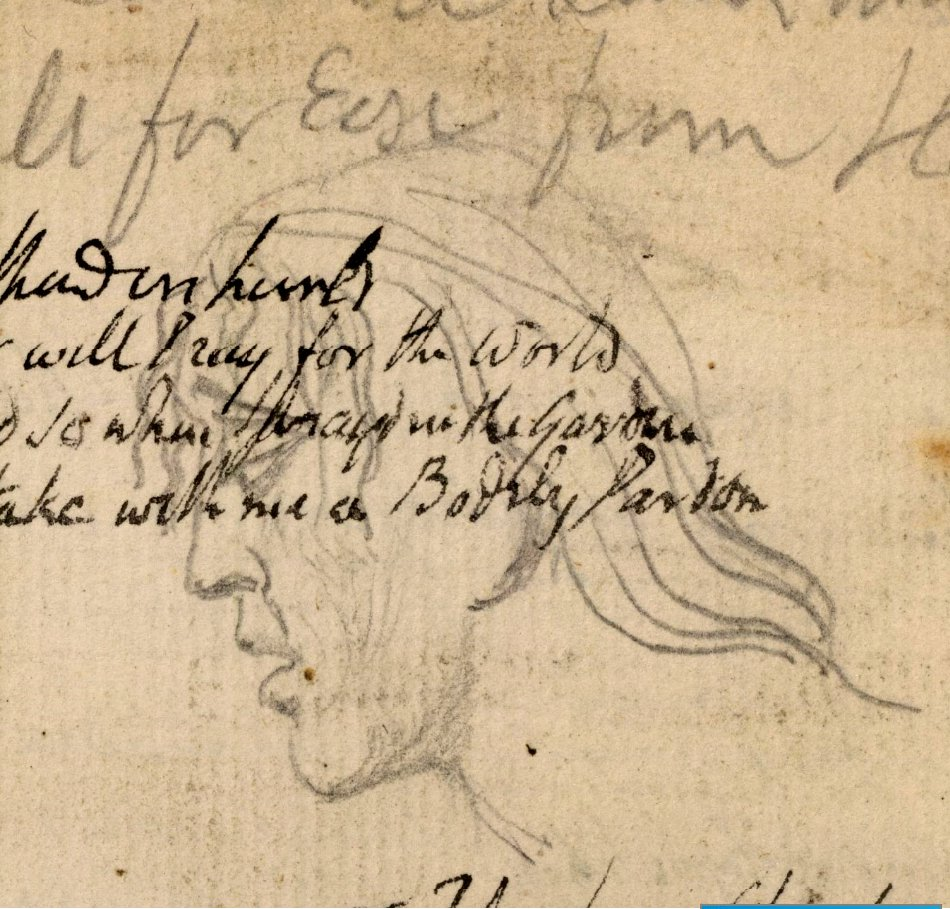
Man's Profile, p.54

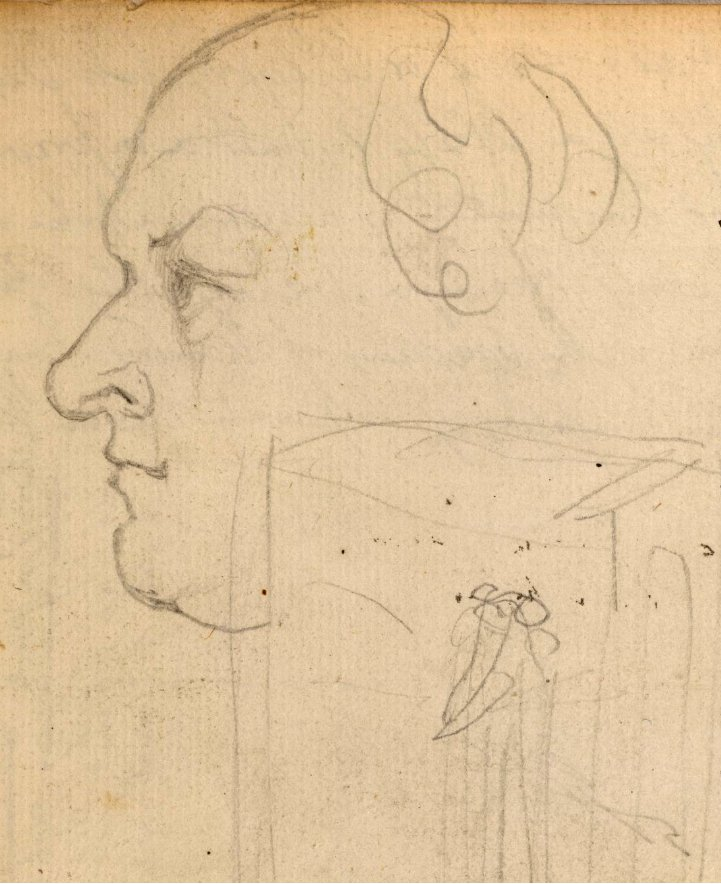
Selfportrait, p.67

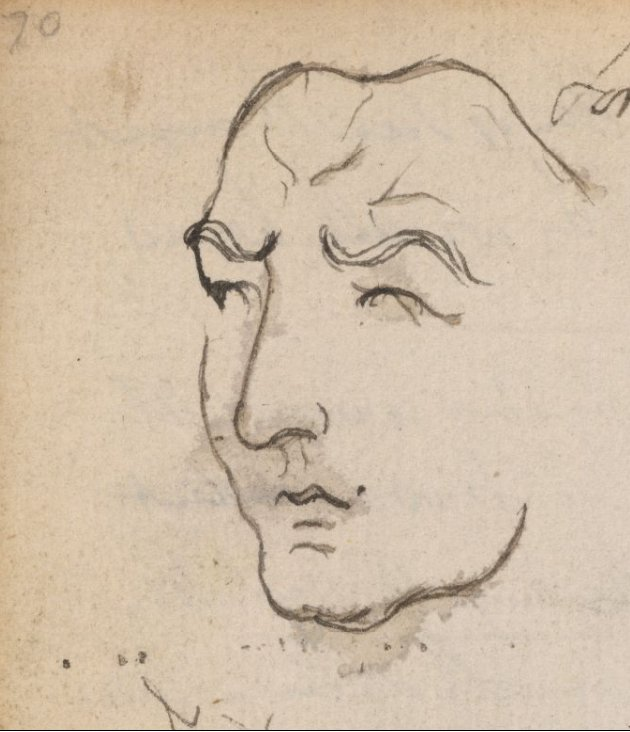
Sad Face, p.70

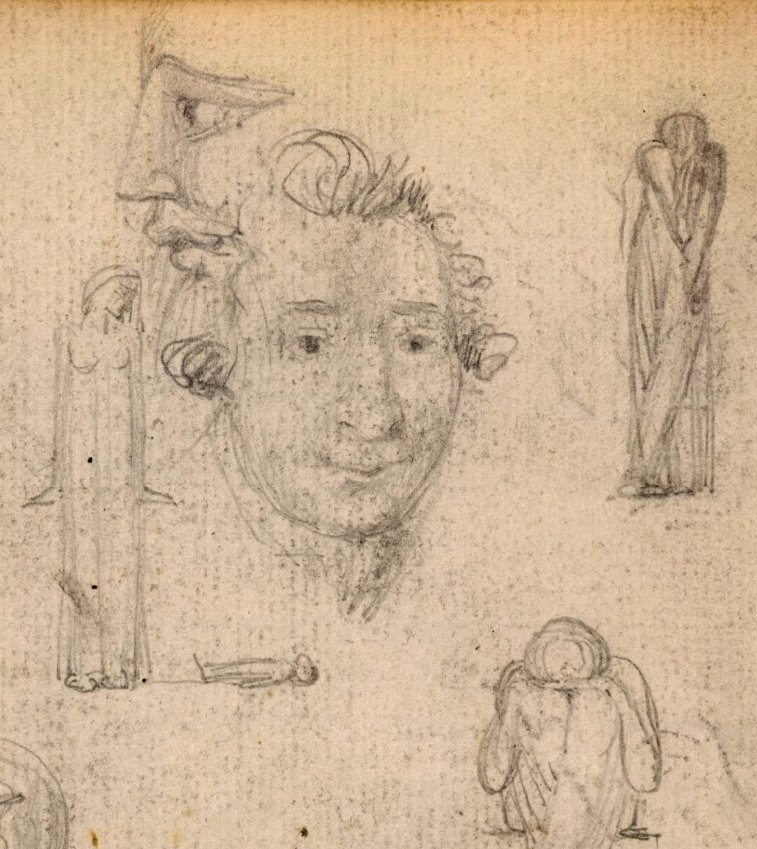
Tom Paine, p.74

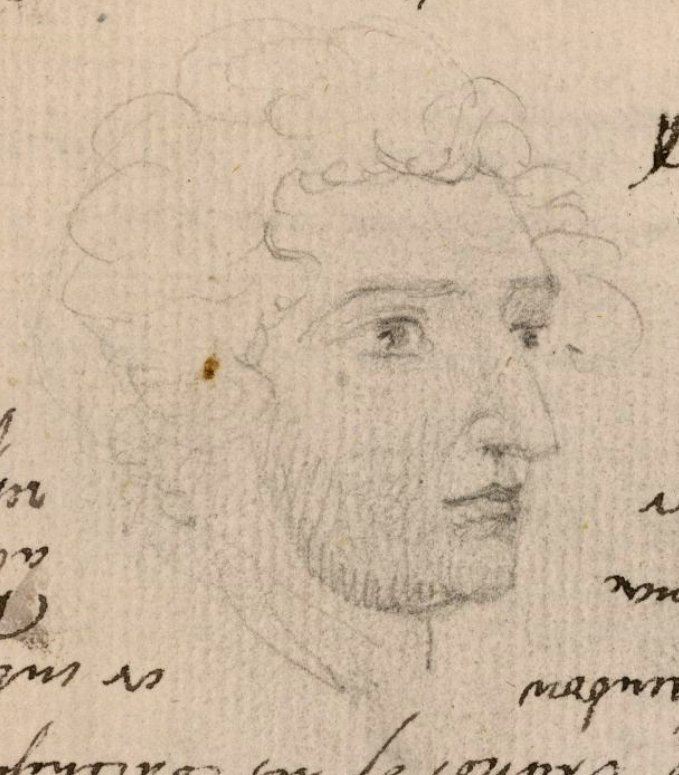
Catherine Blake? p.82

These sketches often serve as the sources for Blake's later works, illustrations of his books, engravings, watercolors, etc. Here are some examples:

Image	Description	Image	Description	Image	Description
	attrib. to Robert Blake: Oberon and Titania Reclining on a Poppy (ill. to Shakespeare's A Midsummer Night's Dream?), Monochrome wash drawing, c. 1786–87. Butlin 201.5(13), p.13 British Library, London, England		William Blake: Oberon and Titania (ill. to Shakespeare's A Midsummer Night's Dream?), from The Song of Los, copy A, Relief etching with color printing and hand colouring. 1795 object 5 British Museum		William Blake: Oberon and Titania (ill. to Shakespeare's A Midsummer Night's Dream?), from The Song of Los, copy C, Relief etching with color printing and hand colouring. 1795 object 5 Morgan Library and Museum, New York, USA
	Tiger. Ink sketch from Notebook, p.6		Tiger. Engraving from Designs to a Series of Ballads of William Hayley, copy 1, 1802, Henry E. Huntington Library and Art Gallery, San Marino, California, USA		The Tyger. Songs of Innocence and of Experience, copy Y, 1825, Metropolitan Museum of Art, New York, USA
	The inscription: Thus the traveller hasteth in the Evening; Pencil sketch from Notebook, p.15		The Traveller hasteth in the Evening 14 Publishd [sic] 17 May 1793 by WBlake Lambeth; Engraving from For Children. The Gates of Paradise, 1793, Library of Congress, Washington, D.C., USA		The Traveller hasteth in the Evening 14 Publishd [sic] 17 May 1793 by WBlake Lambeth; Engraving from For the Sexes. The Gates of Paradise, copy D, c. 1825; Morgan Library and Museum
	The inscription: Ah luckless babe born under cruel star And in dead parents baleful ashes bred Full little weenest thou what sorrows are Left thee for portion of thy livelihed Spenser Pencil sketch from Notebook, p.19		Alas! Engraving from For Children. The Gates of Paradise, copy D, object 9, 1793, Library of Congress		7 What are these? Alas! the Female Martyr Is She also the Divine Image Publishd [sic] 17 May 1793 by WBlake Lambeth; Engraving from For the Sexes. The Gates of Paradise, 1825, object 9 Inscribed in graphite lower center: "7. One dies! Alas! the living and dead! One is slain! and one is fled! Blake's 'Key'."; Yale Center for British Art at Yale University in downtown New Haven, Connecticut, USA; Paul Mellon Collection
	Oothoon & the Nymph-Marigold. Pencil sketch from Notebook, p.28		Oothoon & the Nymph-Marigold. Relief etching with monotyped color from Visions of the Daughters of Albion, copy G, object 3, 1795; Houghton Library, Harvard University, Cambridge, Massachusetts, USA		Oothoon & the Nymph-Marigold. Relief etching with monotyped color from Visions of the Daughters of Albion, copy O, object 3, c. 1818; British Museum
	Nebuchadnezzar. Pencil sketch from Notebook, p.44		Nebuchadnezzar. Colour print, ink and watercolour on paper, 1795/c.1805 Tate Britain, London, England		Nebuchadnezzar. Etching and watercolour on paper, The Marriage of Heaven and Hell, copy I, 1827; Fitzwilliam Museum, Cambridge, England.
	(Without inscription); Count Ugolino and his sons in prison Pencil sketch from Notebook, p.59		Does thy God O Priest take such vengeance as this? Engraving from For the Sexes. The Gates of Paradise, copy D, c. 1825; Morgan Library and Museum		Count Ugolino and his sons in prison (Ill. to Dante. Inferno Canto XXXIII 13–93) c.1826. pen, tempera and gold on panel Fitzwilliam Museum
	The inscription: What we hope we see Pencil sketch from Notebook, p.61		Fear & hope are – Vision. Engraving from For Children. The Gates of Paradise, 1793, Yale Center for British Art		Fear & hope are – Vision. Engraving from For the Sexes. The Gates of Paradise, copy D, c. 1825; Morgan Library and Museum
	The inscription: I found him beneath a tree in the Garden; Pencil sketch from Notebook, p.63		I found him beneath a Tree; Engraving from For Children. The Gates of Paradise, copy D, object 3, 1793, Library of Congress		I found him beneath a Tree; Engraving from For the Sexes. The Gates of Paradise, copy D, object 3, c. 1825; Morgan Library and Museum
	The inscription: he rears from off the pool His mighty stature Milton; Pencil sketch from Notebook, p.91		Fire; Engraving from For Children. The Gates of Paradise, copy D, object 7, 1793, Library of Congress		Fire; Engraving from For the Sexes. The Gates of Paradise, copy D, object 7, c. 1825; Morgan Library and Museum
	The inscription: Thou hast set thy heart as the heart of God- Ezekiel; Two sketches (pencil and sepia) from Notebook, p.94		Air; Engraving from For Children. The Gates of Paradise, copy D, object 6, 1793, Library of Congress		Air; Engraving from For the Sexes. The Gates of Paradise, copy D, object 6, c. 1825; Morgan Library and Museum
	Satan with a shield and spear, sketch from Notebook, p.112		Satan Exulting over Eve. Graphite, pen and black ink, and watercolor over color print, illustration of Paradise Lost, 1795. 1795. The Getty Center, in Brentwood, Los Angeles, California		Satan Exulting over Eve. Medium Colour print, ink and watercolour on paper mounted on canvas, illustration of Paradise Lost, 1795. Tate Britain

== Owners ==
The volume was presented by Catherine Blake (Blake's widow) in 1827 to William Palmer, brother of Blake's pupil, Samuel Palmer. It was bought from him by Dante Gabriel Rossetti 30 April 1847. Later it was purchased by F. S. Ellis (at Rossetti's sale, T. G. Wharton, Martin & Co., 5 July 1882, lot 487) and by Ellis and Scruton (at Ellis's sale, Sotheby's, 18 Nov 1885, lot 608). Sold by Dodd, Mead and Co. of New York (f. ib) to William Augustus White (d. 1928) of Brooklyn, 26 Jan 1887. Inherited by his daughter, Mrs Frances Hillard Emerson (d. 1957) of Cambridge, Massachusetts. Presented by Mrs F. H. Emerson. Now in the possession of British Library: Add MS 49460.

== See also ==
- Never pain to tell thy love

== Bibliography ==
- 2nd vol. of Life of William Blake, by Alexander Gilchrist, D. G. Rossetti, W. M. Rossetti, Anne Gilchrist (Chapter: Ideas of good and evil), 1863 & 1880.
- A. C. Swinburne. William Blake, a critical essay (Chapter: Lyrical poems), 1868.
- The Poems of William Blake, ed. by W. B. Yeats, 1893, rev. 1905.
- The poetical works of William Blake; a new and verbatim text from the manuscript engraved and letterpress originals; With variorum readings and bibliographical notes and prefaces, edited by Sampson, John, Clarendon Press Oxford, 1905.
- The Note-book of William Blake, ed. G. Keynes, 1935
- Blake Complete Writings, ed. G. Keynes, Nonesuch press 1957, OUP 1966/85
- The Complete Poetry & Prose of William Blake, ed. by David V. Erdman, Anchor Books, 1965/1982/1988 (see also at the Blake archive)
- Erdman, Errors in the 1973 edition of The Notebook . . ., Blake Newsletter, ix, 1975, pp. 39, 40
- G. E. Bentley Jr., Blake Books, Oxford, 1977, pp. 321–34 and passim.
- William Blake The Complete Poems, ed. Alicia Ostriker, Penguin Books 1977
- The Notebook of William Blake, ed. D. V. Erdman and D. K. Moore, New York, 1977
- M. L. Greenberg, "The Rossettis transcription of Blake's notebook", and "William Michael Rossetti's transcription and William Bell Scott's tracings from Blake's notebook", The Library, 6th ser., iv, 1982, pp. 249–72, and vi, 1984, pp. 254–76.
