= Ten Blake Songs =

Song cycle by Ralph Vaughan Williams

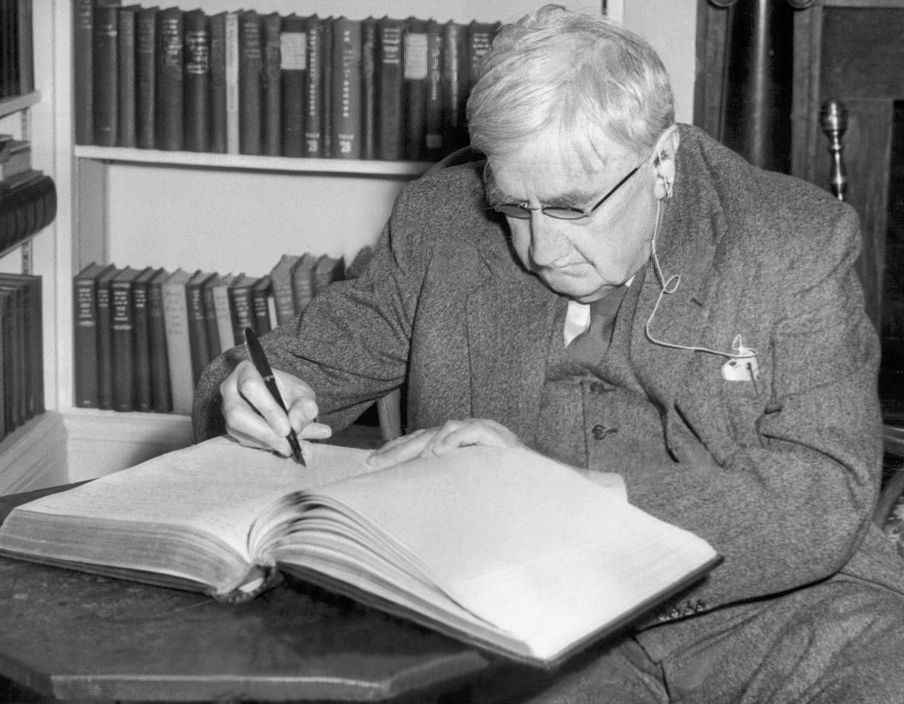
Ralph Vaughan Williams signing the guest book at Yale University in 1954

Ten Blake Songs is a song cycle for tenor or soprano voice and oboe composed over the Christmas period of 1957 by Ralph Vaughan Williams (1872–1958), for the 1958 film The Vision of William Blake by Guy Brenton for Morse Films. The first nine songs are from Songs of Innocence and of Experience by the English poet and visionary William Blake (1757–1827); the tenth (Eternity) is from Several Questions Answered (No1 & No2) from the poet's notebook . The cycle is dedicated to the tenor Wilfred Brown and the oboist Janet Craxton. It was first performed in concert and broadcast on the BBC Third Programme on 8 October 1958, shortly after the composer's death.

The songs are:

1. "Infant Joy" (Innocence)
2. "A Poison Tree" (Experience)
3. "The Piper" (Innocence, titled 'Introduction')
4. "London" (Experience)
5. "The Lamb" (Innocence)
6. "The Shepherd" (Innocence)
7. "Ah! Sun-flower" (Experience)
8. "Cruelty Has a Human Heart" (Experience, titled 'A Divine Image')
9. "The Divine Image" (Innocence)
10. "Eternity" (Several Questions Answered, closing words)
