= Never pain to tell thy love =

1863 poem by William Blake

- by William Blake
- Language: English
- Publication date: 1863

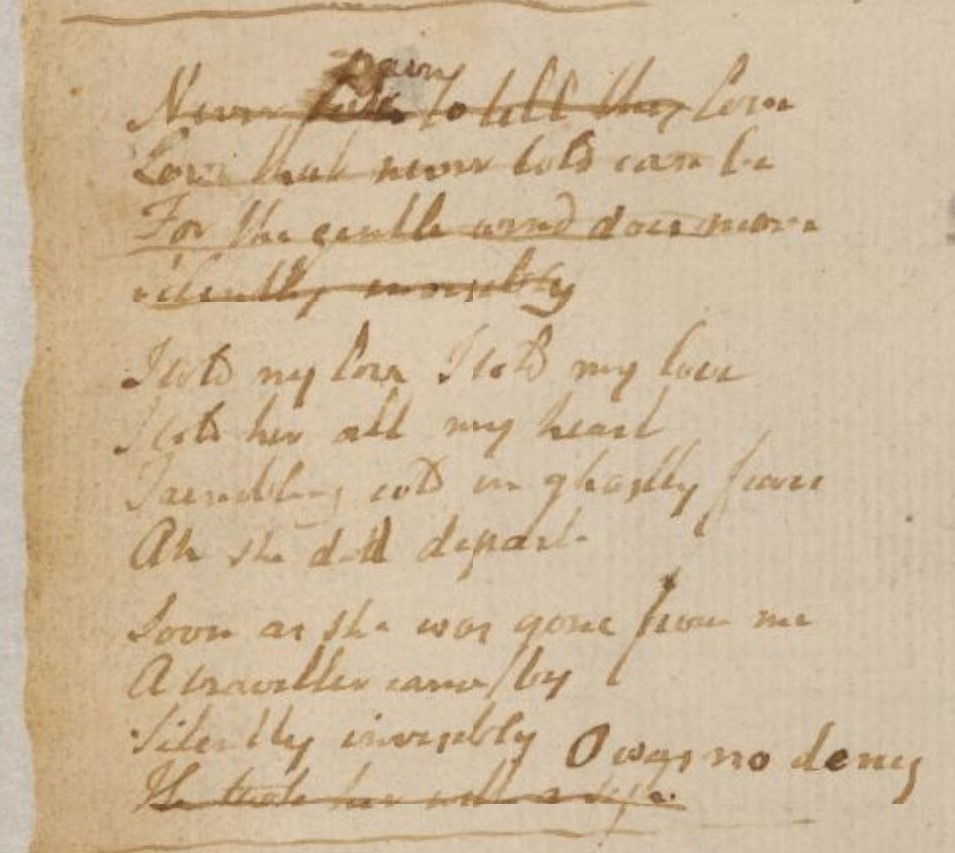
Blake's manuscript: "Never pain to tell thy love..."

"Never pain to tell thy love" is a poem by William Blake.

It was first published in 1863 by Dante Gabriel Rossetti in his edition of Blake's poems, which formed the second volume of Alexander Gilchrist's posthumous Life of William Blake. It was edited from a notebook in Rossetti's possession, now known as the Rossetti MS., containing a great number of sketches, draft poems, polemical prose, and miscellaneous writings, which Blake kept by him for many years.

As the only textual authority for many of these poems is a foul papers, some of them are partly editorial reconstructions. In the notebook the first stanza of "Never pain to tell thy love" has been marked for deletion. Two variant readings are sometimes found in published versions of the poem. In the first line "seek" was deleted by Blake and replaced by "pain", and the final line replaced the deleted version "He took her with a sigh".

== See also ==
- Notebook of William Blake
