= Janet Craxton =

English oboe player and teacher (1929-1981)

Janet Helen Rosemary Craxton (17 May 1929 – 18 July 1981) was an English oboe player and teacher. She was the youngest of the six children and the only daughter of the pianist and teacher Harold Craxton. Her older brothers included the artist John Craxton. She married the composer Alan Richardson in 1961.

Janet Craxton studied at the Royal Academy of Music from 1945 to 1948 and at the Paris Conservatoire from 1948 to 1949. She was principal oboist of the Hallé Orchestra from 1949 to 1952, the London Mozart Players from 1952 to 1954, the BBC Symphony Orchestra from 1954 to 1963, the London Sinfonietta from 1969 to 1981, and the orchestra of the Royal Opera House from 1979 to 1981. She was appointed oboe professor at the Royal Academy of Music in 1958.

She was much in demand as a soloist, and gave world premières of works by Ralph Vaughan Williams, Lennox Berkeley, Alan Rawsthorne, Elisabeth Lutyens, Elizabeth Maconchy, Richard Stoker and Priaulx Rainier. In 1958, she was co-dedicatee and original performer with the tenor Wilfred Brown of Ralph Vaughan Williams' song cycle Ten Blake Songs. At a memorial concert at Aylesbury in 1978, she performed the first oboe concerto by Rutland Boughton. She died aged 52 from breast cancer, in 1981.
