= Pity =

Sympathetic sorrow evoked by the suffering of others

Pity is a sympathetic sorrow evoked by the suffering of others. The word is comparable to compassion, condolence, or empathy. It derives from the Latin pietas (etymon also of piety). Self-pity is pity directed towards oneself.

Two different kinds of pity can be distinguished, "benevolent pity" and "contemptuous pity". In the latter, through insincere, pejorative usage, pity connotes feelings of superiority, condescension, or contempt.

== Psychological opinions ==
Psychologists see pity arising in early childhood out of the infant's ability to identify with others.

Psychoanalysis sees a more convoluted route to (at least some forms of) adult pity by way of the sublimation of aggression—pity serving as a kind of magic gesture intended to show how leniently one should oneself be treated by one's own conscience.

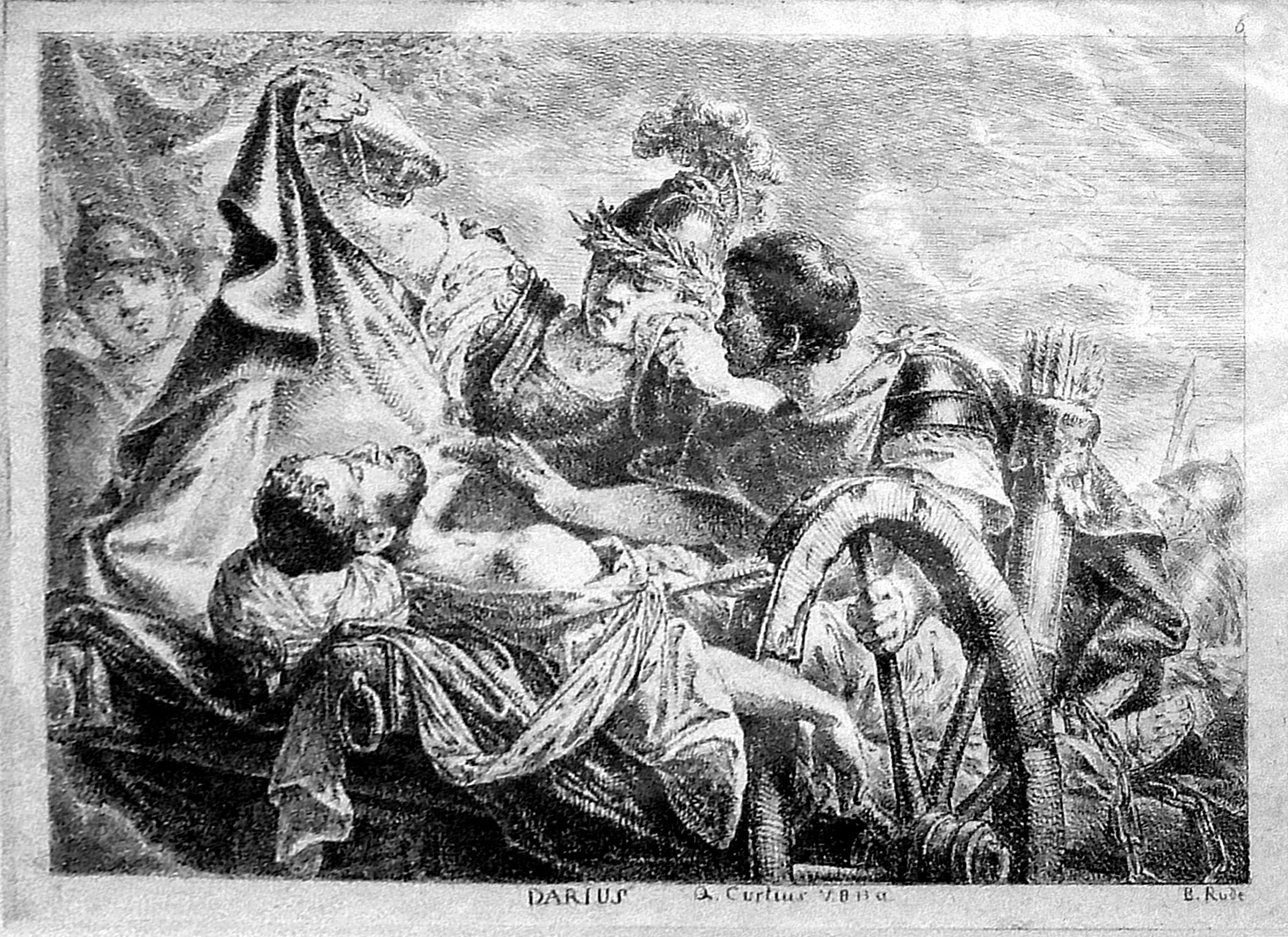
Alexander sees with a look of pity that Darius has died from his wounds.

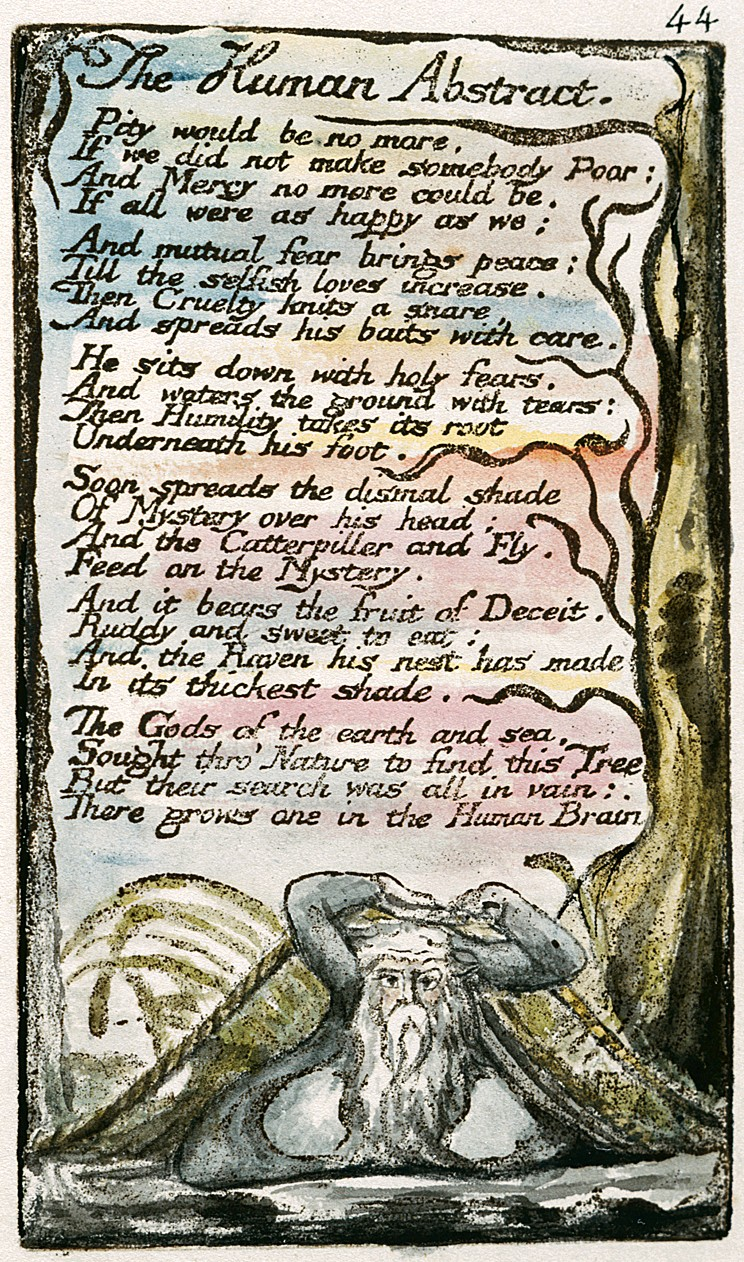
The Human Abstract, a poem in William Blake's collection Songs of Innocence and of Experience, in which he proclaims "Pity would be no more, / If we did not make somebody Poor" (1–2). This version is copy L created in 1795 and currently held by the Yale Center for British Art.

== Religious views ==
In the West, the religious concept of pity was reinforced after acceptance of Judeo-Christian concepts of God pitying all humanity, as found initially in the Jewish tradition: "Like as a father pitieth his children, so the Lord pitieth them that fear him" (Psalms 103:13). The Hebrew word hesed translated in the Septuagint as eleos carries the meaning roughly equivalent to pity in the sense of compassion, mercy, and loving-kindness.

In Mahayana Buddhism, Bodhisattvas are described by the Lotus Sutra as those who "hope to win final Nirvana for all beings—for the sake of the many, for their weal and happiness, out of pity for the world".

== Philosophical assessments ==
Aristotle in his Rhetoric argued that before a person can feel pity for another human, the person must first have experienced suffering of a similar type, and the person must also be somewhat distanced or removed from the sufferer. He defines pity as follows: "Let pity, then, be a kind of pain in the case of an apparent destructive or painful harm of one not deserving to encounter it, which one might expect oneself, or one of one's own, to suffer, and this when it seems near". Aristotle also pointed out that "people pity their acquaintances, provided that they are not exceedingly close in kinship; for concerning these they are disposed as they are concerning themselves", arguing further that in order to feel pity, a person must believe that the person who is suffering does not deserve their fate. Developing a traditional Greek view in his work on poetry, Aristotle also defines tragedy as a kind of imitative poetry that provokes pity and fear.

David Hume in his Treatise of Human Nature argued that "pity is concern for... the misery of others without any friendship... to occasion this concern." He continues that pity "is derived from the imagination." When one observes a person in misfortune, the observer initially imagines his sorrow, even though they may not feel the same. While "we blush for the conduct of those, who behave themselves foolishly before us; and that though they show no sense of shame, nor seem in the least conscious of their folly," Hume argues "that he is the more worthy of compassion the less sensible he is of his miserable condition."

Jean-Jacques Rousseau had the following opinion of pity as opposed to love for others:

It is therefore certain that pity is a natural sentiment, which, by moderating in every individual the activity of self-love, contributes to the mutual preservation of the whole species. It is this pity which hurries us without reflection to the assistance of those we see in distress; it is this pity which, in a state of nature, stands for laws, for manners, for virtue, with this advantage, that no one is tempted to disobey her sweet and gentle voice: it is this pity which will always hinder a robust savage from plundering a feeble child, or infirm old man, of the subsistence they have acquired with pain and difficulty, if he has but the least prospect of providing for himself by any other means: it is this pity which, instead of that sublime maxim of argumentative justice, Do to others as you would have others do to you, inspires all men with that other maxim of natural goodness a great deal less perfect, but perhaps more useful, Consult your own happiness with as little prejudice as you can to that of others."

Nietzsche pointed out that since all people to some degree value self-esteem and self-worth, pity can negatively affect any situation. Nietzsche considered his own sensitivity to pity a lifelong weakness; and condemned what he called "Schopenhauer's morality of pity... pity negates life".

== Medieval conceptions ==
Geoffrey Chaucer wrote "pite renneth soone in gentil herte" at least ten times in his works, across the Canterbury Tales and the Legend of Good Women. The word "pite" had entered Middle English from Latin "pietas" in seven spellings: "piete", "pietie", "pietye", "pite", "pitie", "pyte", and "pytie". Early Middle English writers did not yet have words such as "sympathy" and "empathy"; and even the word "compassion" is not attested in English until the 14th century. The Mediaeval writer's notion of "pite" was thus somewhat different to the divided ideas of pity and piety in Modern English, which has also since gained connotations of disengagement (the pitier as an observer to and separate from the pitied) and condescension from a superior position.

The many senses of the compound notion are exemplified by how Erasmus' Enchiridion was translated in the 16th century. In the original Latin, talking about the ways of the spirit versus the ways of the flesh, Erasmus says "spiritus pios, caro impios". In translation, the single words in Latin became several phrases in English to encompass the entire range of the original concept, which was by that time bifurcating as the words were bifurcating: "[T]he spiryte maketh us relygyous, obedyent to god, kynde and mercyfull. The flesshe maketh us dispysers of god, disobedyent to god, unkynde and cruell."

Chaucer's line, described by Walter Skeat as being Chaucer's favourite, was understood by Edgar Finley Shannon to be a translation of Ovid's Tristia volume 3, verses 31–32, Shannon describing it as "an admirable translation and adaptation of the passage". A noble mind ("mens generosa" in Ovid, "gentil herte" in Chaucer) is easily moved ("faciles motus capit" in Ovid, "renneth soone" in Chaucer) to kindness ("plababilis irae" in Ovid "pite" in Chaucer). In the Legend, Chaucer describes women in general as "pyëtous".

It wasn't until the 16th century that there was a fully-fledged split between pity and piety. In the 14th century, John Gower was, in contrast, using "pite" in his Confessio Amantis to encompass both concepts, as his Latin glosses to the text reveal, stating that "pite is the foundement of every kinges regiment". Cognates of the word include the Provençal "pietat" and the Spanish "piedad". Like Middle English, Old French took the word from the Latin and gradually split it into "pité" (later "piété") and "pitié". Italian in contrast retained the one word: "pietà", borrowed into English (through French, in the 19th century replacing its older "Vierge de pitié") as a technical concept in the arts: pietà.

== Literary examples ==
- Juvenal considered pity the noblest aspect of human nature.
- Mystic poet William Blake was ambivalent about pity, initially casting it in a negative role, before viewing pity as an emotion that can draw beings together. In The Book of Urizen pity begins when Los looks on the body of Urizen bound in chains. However, Pity furthers the fall, "For pity divides the soul", dividing Los and Enitharmon (Enitharmon is named Pity at her birth). Blake maintained that Pity disarmed righteous indignation leading to action; and, railing further against Pity in The Human Abstract, Blake exclaims: "Pity would be no more, / If we did not make somebody Poor" (1–2).
- J. R. R. Tolkien made pity—that of the hobbits for Gollum—pivotal to the action of The Lord of the Rings: "It was Pity that stayed his hand... the pity of Bilbo may rule the fate of many".
- Wilfred Owen prefaced his collection of war poetry with the claim that "My subject is War and the pity of War. The Poetry is in the pity"—something C. H. Sisson considered to verge on sentimentality.

== See also ==
- Animism – Religious belief that objects, places, and creatures all possess a distinct spiritual essence
- Compassion – Movement or motivation to help others
- Dignity – Person's right to be valued, respected and treated ethically
- Empathy – Capacity to understand or feel what another person is experiencing
- Moral emotions – Variety of social emotions
- Pathetic fallacy – Attribution of human emotion and conduct to non-human things
- Social emotions – Emotions that depend upon other people
- Sympathy – Perception of, understanding of, and reaction to the distress or need of another being
