= Alan Richardson (composer) =

Scottish pianist and composer (1904–1978)

Alan Richardson (29 February 1904 – 29 November 1978) was a Scottish pianist and composer.

== Biography ==
Richardson was born in Edinburgh, where he worked for some time as a pianist for the BBC before going to London to study piano and composition, from 1929 to 1930, with Harold Craxton at the Royal Academy of Music. In 1931 he undertook a concert tour of Australia and New Zealand. He was accompanist for violinist Carl Flesch from 1936 to 1939. Richardson married renowned oboist Janet Craxton, the daughter of his teacher Harold Craxton, in 1961. He was appointed Professor of Piano at the Royal Academy of Music in 1960, a position he held until his death in 1978.

Richardson composed many pieces for piano, as well as some chamber music, including several works for the oboe which he wrote for his wife. He made a recording of his Sussex Lullaby with the viola player Watson Forbes and also dedicated his brief Intrada for viola and piano to Forbes.

Richardson died, aged 74, in London.

== Selected works ==
Richardson's compositions are largely published by Augener Edition, Comus Edition, Oxford University Press, the Scottish Music Centre and Tobias Broeker.

Vocal music

- Animal Nursery Rhymes, for 2 voices and piano (words by Richard Willis) (1934)

Chamber music

- Roundelay for oboe (or clarinet) and piano (1935)
- Bagatelle for violin and piano (1935)
- Sonnet for violin and piano (1938)
- Sussex Lullaby for viola (or cello) and piano (1938)
- Intrada for viola and piano (1939)
- Prelude in A and Gavotte in A from Solo Violin Partita in E by Johann Sebastian Bach for viola and piano (1939)
- Sonata for viola and piano, Op. 21 (1948)
- Autumn Sketches for viola and piano (1949)
- French Suite for oboe and piano (1949)

1. Rendezvous
2. Les Peupliers
3. Passepied
4. Causerie
5. Les Moulins

- Sonata No. 1 for violin and piano (1951)
- 3 Pieces for English horn (or clarinet) and piano, Op. 22 (1952)

1. Prelude
2. Elegy
3. Alla burlesca

- 2 Scottish Tunes for viola and piano (1952); arranged by Watson Forbes and Alan Richardson

1. The Lea Rig
2. Whaur Gadie Rins

- [2 Pieces] for oboe and piano, Op. 23 (1953)

1. A Reverie
2. Scherzino

- Silhouette for violin and piano, Op. 24 (1952)
- 3 Pieces for flute and oboe (from Six Pieces for Duet) (1963)
- Aria and Allegretto for oboe and piano (1965)
- Sonatina for oboe and piano, Op. 51 (1965)
- Sonata for bassoon and piano (1968)
- 3 Pieces for oboe, viola and piano (1970s)
- 3 Inventions for flute and oboe (or any 2 melodic instruments) (1970)
- Sonatina for flute and piano (1970)
- Trio Sonata for viola, bass clarinet and piano (1973)
- In the Lowlands for tuba and piano (1975)
- Rhapsody for viola and piano (1977)
- Sonatina for 2 oboes (published 1979)
- 3 Pieces for solo oboe (published 1981)
- Duo for violin and viola
- 3 Old French Dances for oboe and piano

Piano

- Variations for piano (1935)
- Three pieces for piano (1935)
- Rondo "The Non-Stop" for piano (1935)
- Seguidilla from "Carmen" for piano (1935)
- Piano piece No.1 (1935)
- Piano piece No.2 (1935)
- Minuet for piano (1935)
- Moto perpetuo for piano (transcription of the original work by Niccolo Paganini)
- The Dreaming Spires, Rondel (1935)
- Pavane on a 16th Century Tune (1935)
- Improvisation on a Nursery Tune in G major for piano 4-hands (1937)
- Bagatelle (1938)
- Clorinda (1938)
- Débutante for 2 pianos (1946)
- Grandmother's Waltz in D major for 2 pianos (1946)
- On Heather Hill for 2 pianos (1946)
- Rondo (1947)
- The Wayfarer (1949)
- Jack in the Green (1950)
- 5 Short Pieces (1950)

1. On Tip-toe
2. Walking Tune
3. Carillon
4. Swing Song
5. On Holiday

- Transcription: Rachmaninoff Op. 34 no.14 Vocalise for Piano Solo (February 1951)
- The Gentle Breeze (1954)
- 4 Romantic Studies, Op. 25 (1954)
- Sonata, Op. 26 (1958)
- Sonatina in F, Op. 27 (1960)
- 2 Short Impromptus, Op. 28 (1955)
- [2 Pieces], Op. 29 (1955)

1. Harvest Moon
2. Marionette

- Suite in D, 5 Pieces, Op. 38 (1956)
- 2 Nocturnes, Op. 30 (1957)
- 4 Character Sketches, Op. 31 (1957)
- The Clydesdale Party, Scottish Dance (1957)
- Columbine (1957)
- Over the Moors (1957)
- Prelude in B Flat (1957)
- 2 Country Pictures, Op. 34 (1958)

1. Shepherd's Warning
2. Shepherd's Delight

- The Running Brook (1958)
- Across the Border (1959)
- Alla Marcia (1959)
- Make Believe (1959)
- The Pendulum, Modern Festival Pieces (1959)
- 3 Pieces, Op. 35 (1959)

1. Tableau
2. Silver Night
3. Fantasy-Study

- Rhapsody, Op. 37 (1959)
- Scallywag (1959)
- Canzonetta (1960)
- 4 Pieces (1960)

1. Friday's Child
2. Ballerina
3. Arietta
4. Canzonetta

== Sources ==
- Scottish Music Centre: Alan Richardson
- Alan Richardson biography
