= A Divine Image =

Poem by William Blake

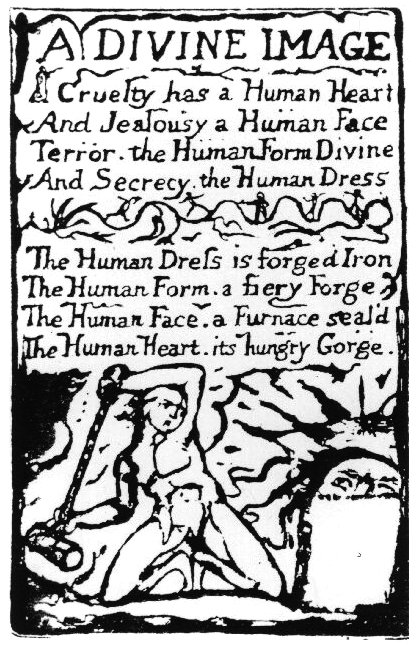
Scan of "A Divine Image"

"A Divine Image" is a poem by William Blake from Songs of Experience, not to be confused with "The Divine Image" from Songs of Innocence. The poem only appeared in copy BB of the combined Songs of Innocence and of Experience.

Ralph Vaughan Williams set the poem to music in his 1958 song cycle Ten Blake Songs, under the title "Cruelty Has a Human Heart".

== Full text ==
Cruelty has a Human Heart
And Jealousy a Human Face
Terror, the Human Form Divine
And Secrecy, the Human Dress

The Human Dress, is forged Iron
The Human Form, a fiery Forge
The Human Face, a Furnace seal'd
The Human Heart, its hungry Gorge.
