= The Little Vagabond =

Poem by William Blake

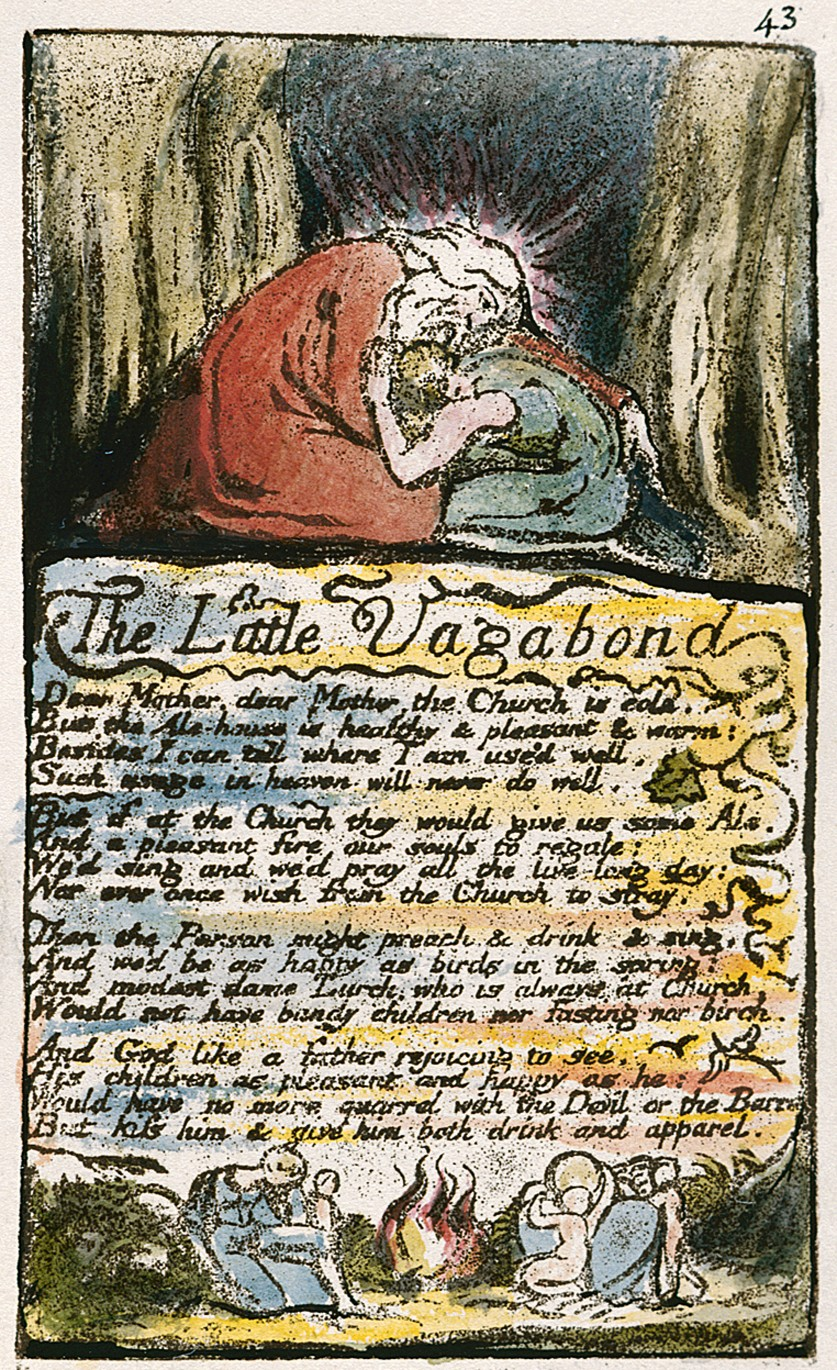
"The Little Vagabond" in one of Blake's several handpainted and printed copies of 'Songs of Innocence and of Experience. This copy is from copy L printed in 1795 and currently held by the Yale Center for British Art.

"The Little Vagabond" is a 1794 poem by English poet William Blake in his collection Songs of Innocence and of Experience. His collection, Songs of Innocence, was originally published alone, in 1789. The scholar Robert Gleckner says that the poem is a form of transformation of the boy in the poem "The School Boy", from Songs of Innocence.

== Summary and structure ==
In "William Blake and the Ten Commandments", critic Paul Kuntz summarizes the main theme of the poem: it gives us a view into the lives of those who get drunk on Sundays versus those who choose to attend church. The poem tells the opinion of the boy who believes that more people would choose to go to church if there were alcoholic beverages. This is because he sees how happy those in the alehouse are, therefore he believes church should have a similar atmosphere and people would be more willing to attend. Also, that it would not be sinful to make the church similar to the alcohol-serving establishment because God wants to see his children happy.

This poem has four stanzas of four lines each. It has an ABCC rhyme scheme in the first stanza, but an AABB rhyme scheme in the last three.

== Poem ==
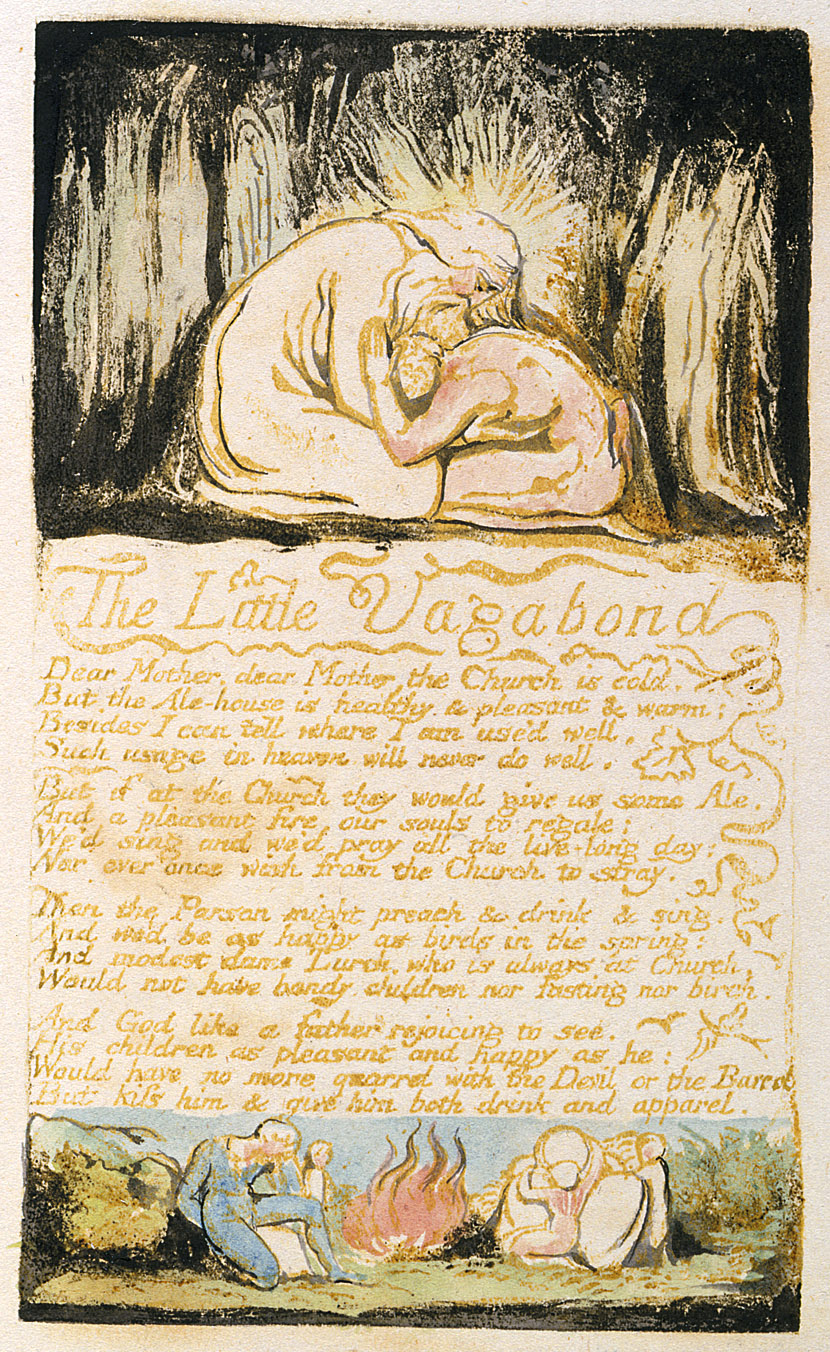
The Little Vagabond as it appeared in Songs of Experience, 1794 in copy B of the Songs of Innocence and of Experience, which is held at the British Museum.

Dear Mother, dear Mother, the Church is cold,
But the Ale-house is healthy & pleasant & warm;
Besides I can tell where I am use'd well,
Such usage in heaven will never do well.

But if at the Church they would give us some Ale.
And a pleasant fire, our souls to regale;
We'd sing and we'd pray, all the live-long day;
Nor ever once wish from the Church to stray,

Then the Parson might preach & drink & sing.
And we'd be as happy as birds in the spring:
And modest dame Lurch, who is always at Church,
Would not have bandy children nor fasting nor birch.

And God like a father rejoicing to see,
His children as pleasant and happy as he:
Would have no more quarrel with the Devil or the Barrel
But kiss him & give him both drink and apparel.

== Plate ==
The top of this plate displays a larger man, possibly God, laying over and protecting a boy. The lower section shows a group of people of different sizes hugging, possibly parents and children, sitting around a fire. The two halves of "Songs of Innocence and Experience" differ in more ways than the writing alone. The imagery on the plates differ as well. The tree bark on the plate of this poem is created using vertical lines; this is different than the tree bark on plates from "Songs of Innocence" because the tree bark is drawn in horizontal strokes on them. The rays of light over the larger man were considered a remarkable section of the plate, as Blake did not often add halos or anything similar over the heads of those in his plates in the past.

== Themes and analysis ==
The repression of children's points of view in terms of church and happiness are motivating factors in Blake's writing of "The Little Vagabond." Another motivating factor is how different people view God in different ways. There have been many different reactions to "The Little Vagabond," from a renowned scholar, Wickstead saying that it is, "the noblest conception of Blake's ever-recurring idea that forgiveness is the only power of salvation" to Gilham's view that "the vagabond's vision is too earthy." Scholar Galia Benziman proposes that the child narrarating could be interpreted as both hypocritical and deceptive, considering his hateful view of the church. She also considers the fact that rather than speaking to the priest about his concerns, the child chooses to proclaim his opinions, making any changes to his local church impossible an important point to recognize.

The unlikely comparison of alehouse and church confused a major contributor to Duke scholarly journals, Coleridge, who says,

"Though I cannot approve altogether of this last poem, and have been inclined to think that the error which is most likely to beset the scholars of Emanuel Swedenborg is that of utterly demerging the tremendous incompatibilities with an evil will that arise out of the essential Holiness of the abysmal A-seity in the love of the Eternal Person, and thus giving temptation to weak minds to sink this love itself into Good Nature, yet still I disapprove the mood of mind in this wild poem so much less than I do the servile blind-worm, wrap-rascal scurf-coat of fear of the modern Saint (whose whole being is a lie, to themselves as well as to their brethren), that I should laugh with good conscience in watching a Saint of the new stamp, one of the first stars of our eleemosynary advertisements, groaning in wind-pipe! and with the whites of his eyes upraised at the audacity of this poem! Anything rather than this degradation I [SE’c] of Humanity, and therein of the Incarnate Divinity."

== Musical settings ==
The poem has been used in a musical format in multiple instances. There is a bibliography which lists all of these, Blake Set to Music: A Bibliography of Musical Settings of the Poems and Prose of William Blake
