= The School Boy =

Poem by William Blake

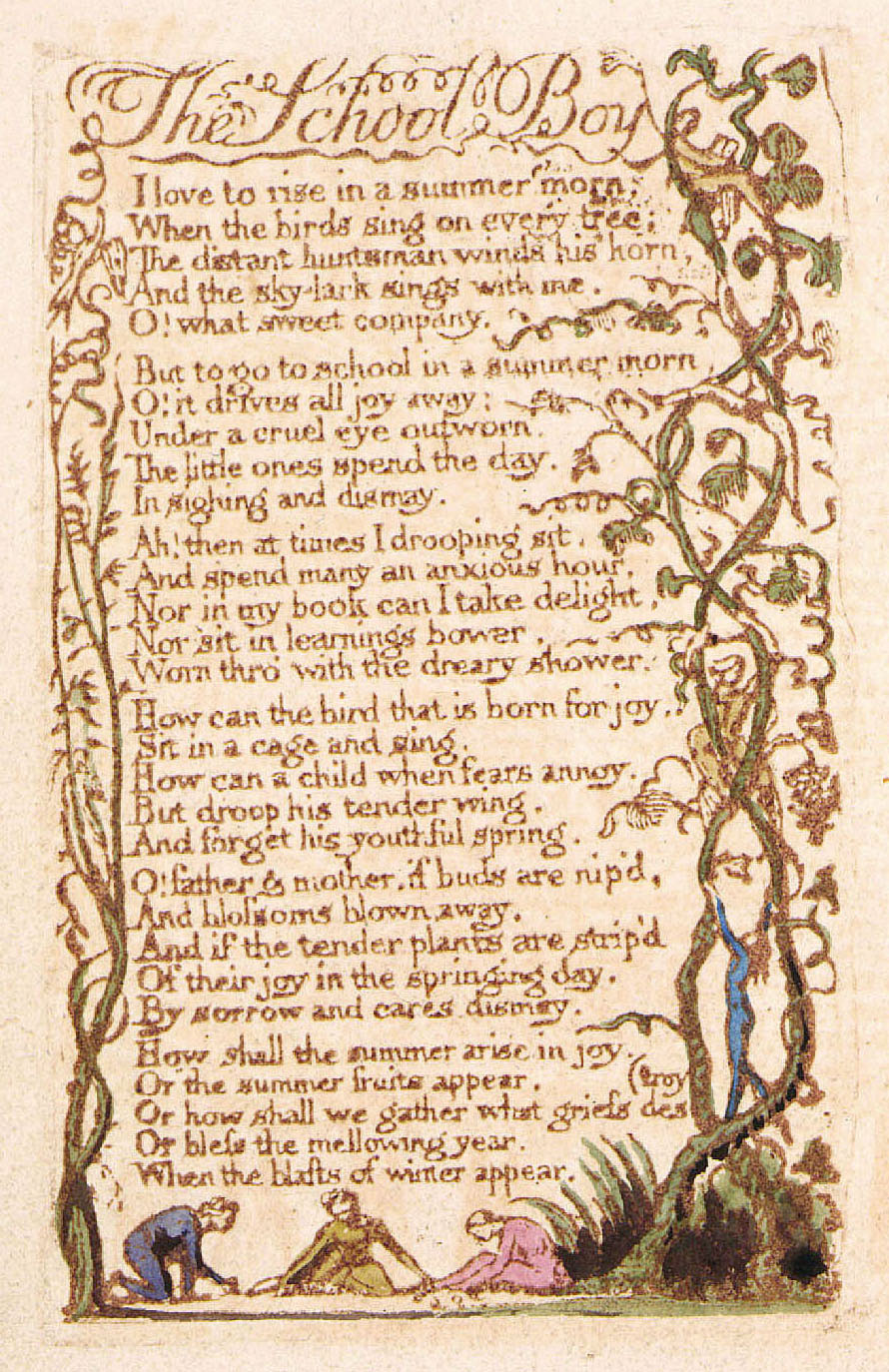
A hand illustrated version of "The School Boy" from Copy B of Songs of Experience currently held at the Library of Congress.

"The School Boy" is a 1789 poem by William Blake and published as a part of his poetry collection entitled Songs of Experience. These poems were later added with Blake's Songs of Innocence to create the entire collection entitled "Songs of Innocence and of Experience Shewing the Two Contrary States of the Human Soul". This collection included poems such as "The Tyger", "The Little Boy Lost", "Infant Joy" and "The Shepherd". These poems are illustrated with colorful artwork created by Blake first in 1789. The first printing in 1789 consisted of sixteen copies. None of the copies of Songs of Innocence are exactly alike as some of them are incomplete or were colored in posthumously "in imitation of" other copies.

"The School Boy" is a poem written in the pastoral tradition that focuses on the downsides of formal learning. It considers how going to school on a summer day "drives all joy away". The boy in this poem is more interested in escaping his classroom than he is with anything his teacher is trying to teach. In lines 16–20, a child in school is compared to a bird in a cage. Meaning something that was born to be free and in nature, is instead trapped inside and made to be obedient.

== Poem transcription ==
I love to rise in a summer morn,
When the birds sing on every tree;
The distant huntsman winds his horn,
And the skylark sings with me:
O what sweet company!

But to go to school in a summer morn,-
O! It drives all joy away!
Under a cruel eye outworn,
The little ones spend the day
In sighing and dismay.

Ah! then at times I drooping sit,
And spend many an anxious hour;
Nor in my book can I take delight,
Nor sit in learning's bower,
Worn through with dreary shower.

How can the bird that is born for joy
Sit in a cage and sing?
How can a child, when fears annoy,
But droop his tender wing,
And forget his youthful spring!

O father and mother if buds are nipped,
And blossoms blown away;
And if the tender plants are stripped
Of their joy in the springing day,
By sorrow and care's dismay,-

How shall the summer arise in joy,
Or the summer fruits appear?
Or how shall we gather what griefs destroy,
Or bless the mellowing year,
When the blasts of winter appear?
-William Blake

=== Interpretation ===
- First stanza: The school boy wakes and sees the sound of birds pleasant. It seemed to him as if the skylark is singing with him. All of these was such a sweet company to him.
- Second stanza: The school boys spent their days in utter despair under the thread of teacher's presence.
- Stanza three describes school, how when home-schooled you can sit happily and read. At school, there is no freedom; you will learn what you are told to learn, nothing more, nothing less. School cannot delight him.
- Stanza four compares good boy at school to a bird in a cage. A bird can't sing in a cage and also, a child can't be happy in school: his potential is restrained.
- Stanza five shows how people are dismayed at school and how students are stripped of their joy.
- The final stanza describes how school can never be fun, but it is like a cold winter's day blasting through the warm summer.
- In the last two stanzas Blake makes a heartfelt plea to parents using an extended metaphor of the natural cycles of life. In the world of nature, a bud grows into a flowering tree that will bear fruit as it matures. Blake references the seasons, describing how an Autumn harvest of fruit sustains life through the harsh Winter. In this way, he is illustrating how a happy childhood spent learning from the natural world will reap the benefits of a wise and fruitful old age. Sending children to school interferes with this natural cycle and results in a lifetime of unhappiness with no chance of cultivating wisdom.
- He likes the summer morning.
- He doesn't like the school.
- He thinks school is a waste of time.
- He thinks students can't be happy.
- He thinks there is no freedom in the school.
- He thinks students in school are stripped of their joy.

== Illustration and form ==
The illustration for this poem predominantly features elements of nature, which is reflected in the poem's content. At the bottom of the print, there are three human figures sitting down examining either the ground or something upon the ground. This indicates an interest in nature and of what it is compiled.

Around the border of the print is a weaving of intertwined vines. Within these vines are foliage such as leaves and flowers-nature within nature. There is also a human figure perched near the base of the vines with her arms extended, reaching up into the climbing flora. Further up the vines, there are two human figures sitting in the crook of two separate vines, each one is reading. This could indicate that the farther one travels into nature, the more one will learn. This, based on Blake's emphasis on a "Natural" education.

Also among the leaves and fruit of the vines, on the left of the print is a bird about to take flight. "Both victory and liberty [...] are associated with bird wings." Birds can also symbolize knowledge and nature. The presence of the bird, further indicated the freedom and learning that can come from education from nature rather than the formal classroom.

Arranged in six stanzas with five lines each, this poem follows a consistently patterned structure. It also contains a rhyme scheme of ABABB.

== Themes and critical analysis ==
This poem highlights Blake's affinity for alternative methods of education. Consistently repeated is the draining element of schoolroom education and how it causes students to contribute poor learning and retention for students. Blake instead promotes learning outside the classroom, specifically he believes spontaneous and natural creativity flourishes. Furthermore, this desire to remove oneself from the classroom (a metaphor for society) is in reference to Anthony Ashley Cooper, the 3rd Earl of Shaftesbury's idea of retirement. In this instance, retirement means to remove oneself from society and return to nature in order to rejuvenate the soul and the imagination from the weary doggedness of society. Cooper believed that remaining in society for a long period of time would result in the soul becoming worn down and that nature was the only relief as it helped redevelop the idea of community and benevolence.

The analogy of the bird and the boy is also evidence of the recurring theme of nature within this poem. As a poet of Romanticism, Blake puts an emphasis on nature, the subjective self and on emotions. Within this poem, the allusions to nature are everywhere referencing things such as summer, wind, blossoms, rain showers, birds and spring. Blake equates the seasons of the Earth to the seasons of the boy's life. Blake also analogizes the boy with a caged bird unable to sing, to attain its free place in nature, just like the boy.

David Almond references "The School Boy" in his novel Skellig to validate his character Mina's non-formal learning provided to her by her mother and supplemented heavily by Blake's materials. Sahm writes that "Mina and her mother quote and reference Blake directly, and many of the characters share his interest in education, spirituality, and imagination. But more than merely quoting Blake's words, the characters in Skellig live and exemplify one of his primary ideas: that of contraries". "The Schoolboy" continually brings up how being in a traditional school setting is draining, and will make a boy "forget his youthful spring".

== Sources ==
- Davies, J. G. (1968). "Review of Blake's Contrary States: The 'Songs of Innocence and of Experience' as Dramatic Poems". The Modern Language Review. 63 (1): 206–207. doi:10.2307/3722712. JSTOR 3722712.
- Guest, Harriet; Barrell, John (1988). "'Who Ever Perished, Being Innocent?' Some Plates from the 'Songs of Innocence'". Style. 22 (2): 238–262. JSTOR 42945709.
- B., L. (1933). "Blake's Songs of Innocence and Experience". The British Museum Quarterly. 7 (3): 66–65. doi:10.2307/4421435. JSTOR 4421435.
- Latham, Don (September 2008). "Empowering Adolescent Readers: Intertextuality in Three Novels by David Almond". Children's Literature in Education. 39 (3): 213–226. doi:10.1007/s10583-007-9052-6. S2CID 145703675.
- Morgenstern, John (2002). "The Fall into Literacy and the Rise of the Bourgeois Child". Children's Literature Association Quarterly. 27 (3): 136–145. doi:10.1353/chq.0.1312. Project MUSE 249966.
- Sahm, Danielle (14 May 2010). "Contrary to Expectations: Exploring Blake's Contraries in David Almond's Skellig". Children's Literature. 38 (1): 115–132. Project MUSE 380761.
- Simpson, Matt (1992). "Blake's 'Songs of Innocence and Experience'". Critical Survey. 4 (1): 22–27. JSTOR 41555619.
