= The Blossom =

Poem by William Blake

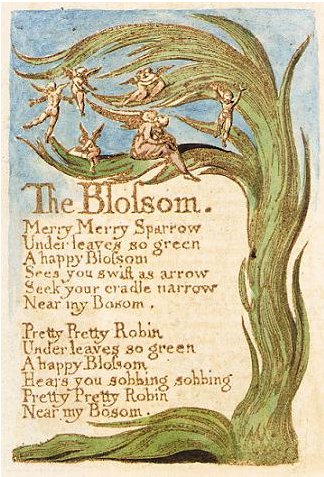
The Blossom, Songs of Innocence and of Experience, copy C, 1789, 1794 (Library of Congress) object 10

Reading of "The Blossom"

"The Blossom" is a poem by William Blake, published in Songs of Innocence in 1789.

== Poem ==
Merry Merry Sparrow
Under leaves so green
A happy Blossom
Sees you swift as arrow
Seek your cradle narrow
Near my Bosom.

Pretty Pretty Robin
Under leaves so green
A happy Blossom
Hears you sobbing sobbing
Pretty Pretty Robin
Near my Bosom.

== Analysis ==
This poem is full of cheerful images of life, such as the "leaves so green", and "happy blossom". The poem tells the tale of two different birds: a sparrow and a robin. The former is clearly content with its existence, whereas the latter is distraught with it, meaning the second stanza becomes full of negative, depressing images. "The Blossom" was inspired by the power of imagination and reality rather than general symbols such as the sparrow representing the upper class and the robin representing the lower class. The infant in the poem is at the mother's breast but most likely it was a nurse's breast; the sparrow represents the child's happiness while the robin represents desolation as robins traditionally appear during the winter, one could assume that it is upset at having missed the exciting, lively critiques that occur with summer – such as blossoms.

Blake lived in St. Paul's parish, which in 1782 decided to take care of its poor, especially its poor children. Thus, Blake wrote in Songs of Innocence about how the parish sent foundling children to the country to be cared for by nurses—foster mothers. He also observed the parish starting charity day schools for poor children in which the students got better education than their more prosperous peers, the children of tradesmen. Unfortunately, in just a few years the benevolence became tainted with little care or money given to the poor, complaints about poor children being better educated than other children and so schools changed to become harsh with children being sent to work (Gardner 30-33; 54-55).

Another possible interpretation is a sexual one, where the poem represents the joy that can be found through innocent sexual love. The sparrow, seeking his cradle "swift as an arrow", has been interpreted in a phallic sense, and demonstrates the innocence and joy of free love. The "happy blossom" in this sense is therefore the female sexual organs, which is happy upon seeing the arrival of the sparrow. The "sobbing, sobbing" robin has been interpreted in several different ways. Either it is the opposite to the sparrow's open love, a creature who has been harmed through love or possibly violated, or it is another creature rejoicing in the joy of sexual love, in which case its sobbing could be orgasmic. Many of his poems, such as "The Little Girl Lost" and "Found", "The Lilly" or "The Angel", also follow this theme of giving in to desires and sexual love.

== Gallery ==
Scholars agree that "The Blossom" is the 11th object in the order of the original printings of the Songs of Innocence and of Experience. The following, represents a comparison of several of the extant copies of the poem, their print date, their order in that particular printing of the poems, and their holding institution:

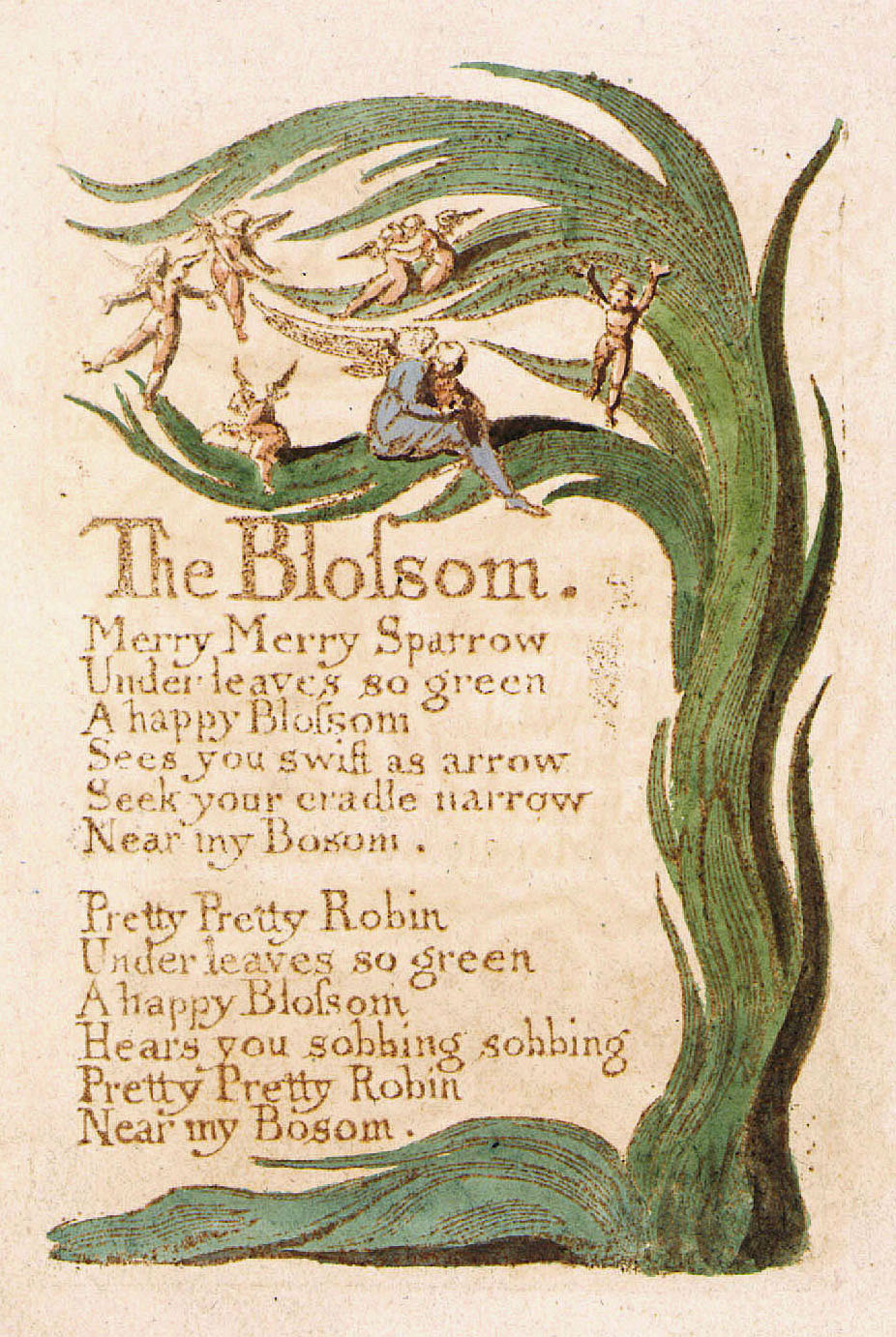
Songs of Innocence, copy B, 1789 (Library of Congress), object 28

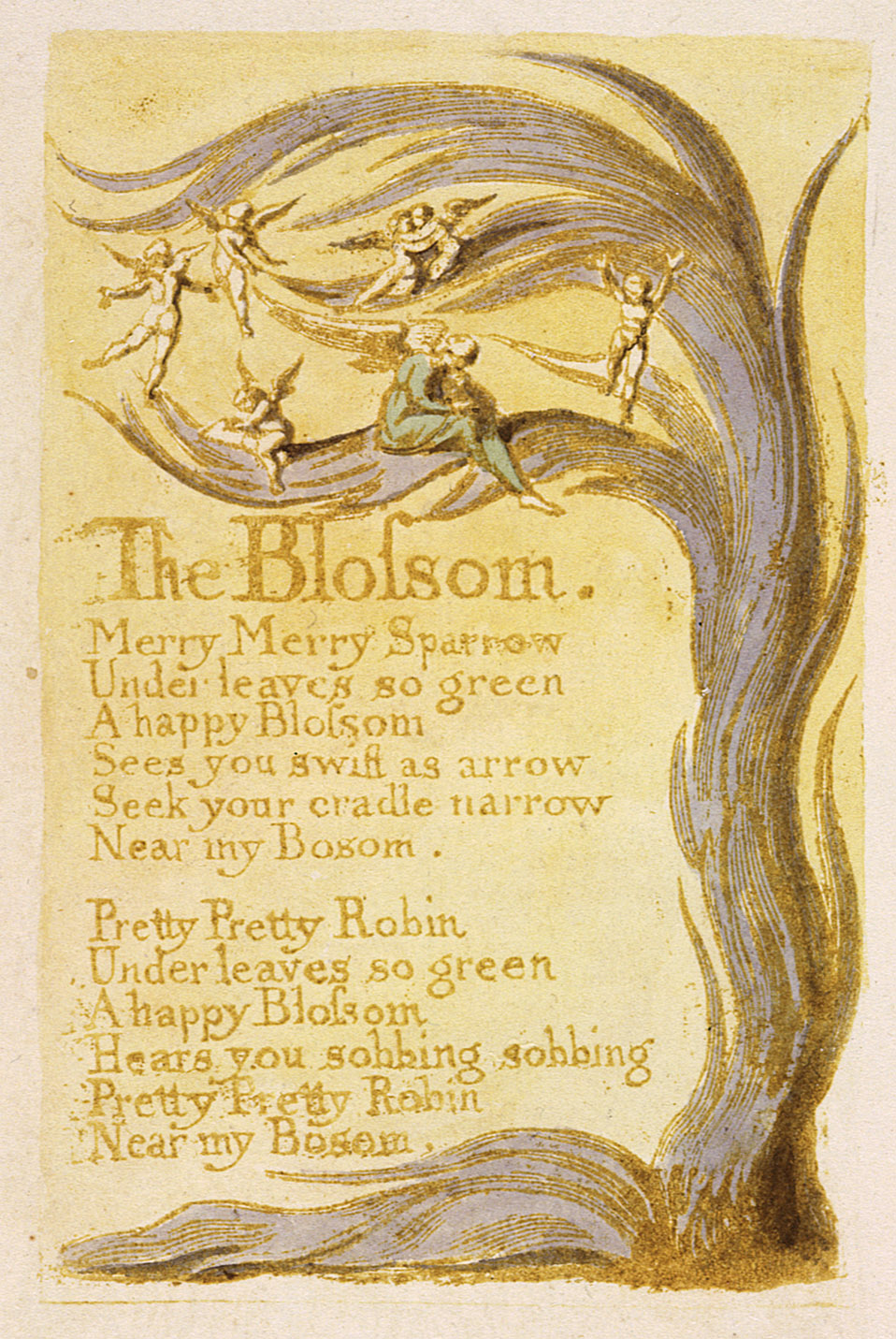
Songs of Innocence, copy G, 1789 (Yale Center for British Art) object 9

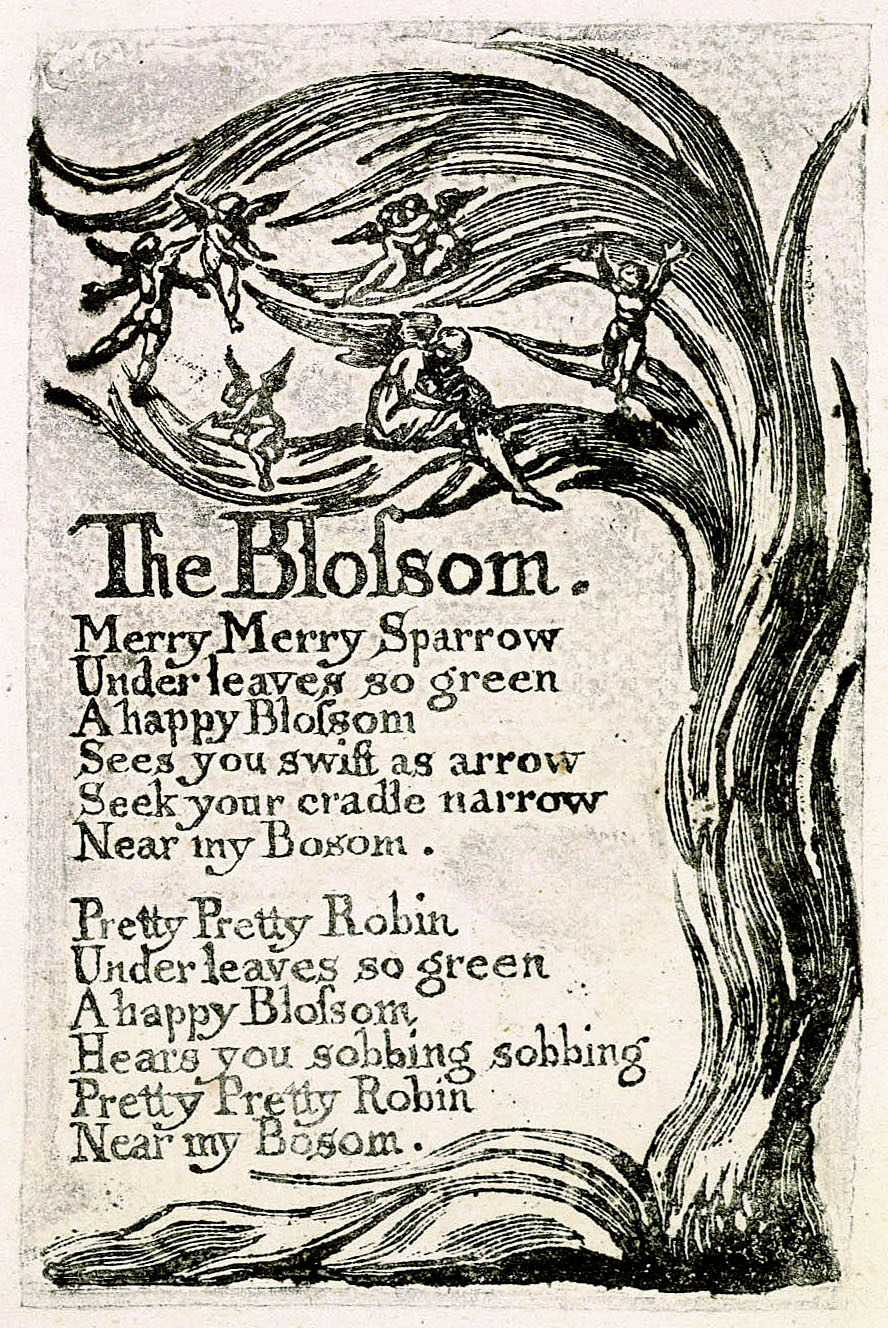
Songs of Innocence, copy U, 1789 (Houghton Library) object 8

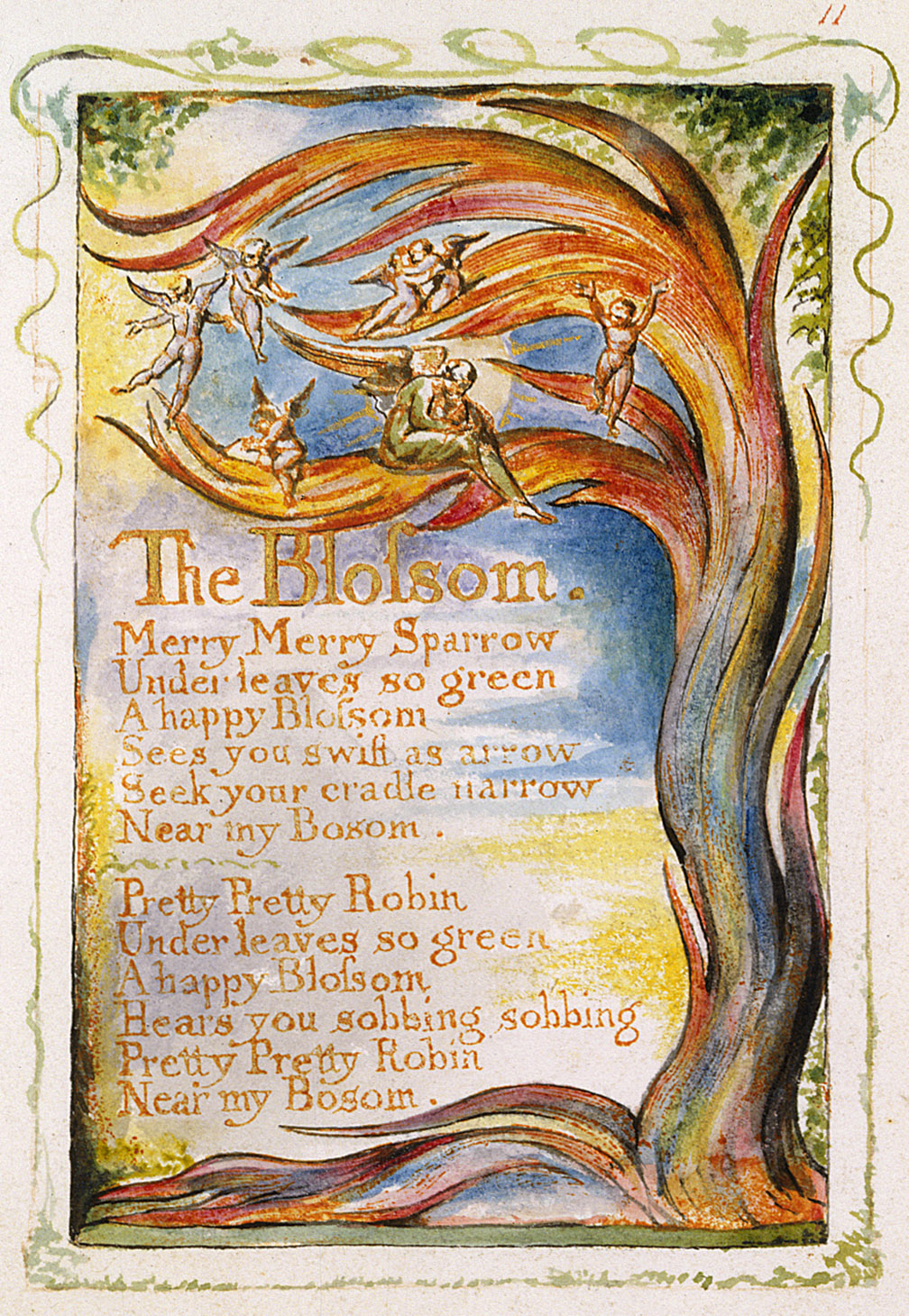
Songs of Innocence and of Experience, copy Y, 1825 (Metropolitan Museum of Art) object 11

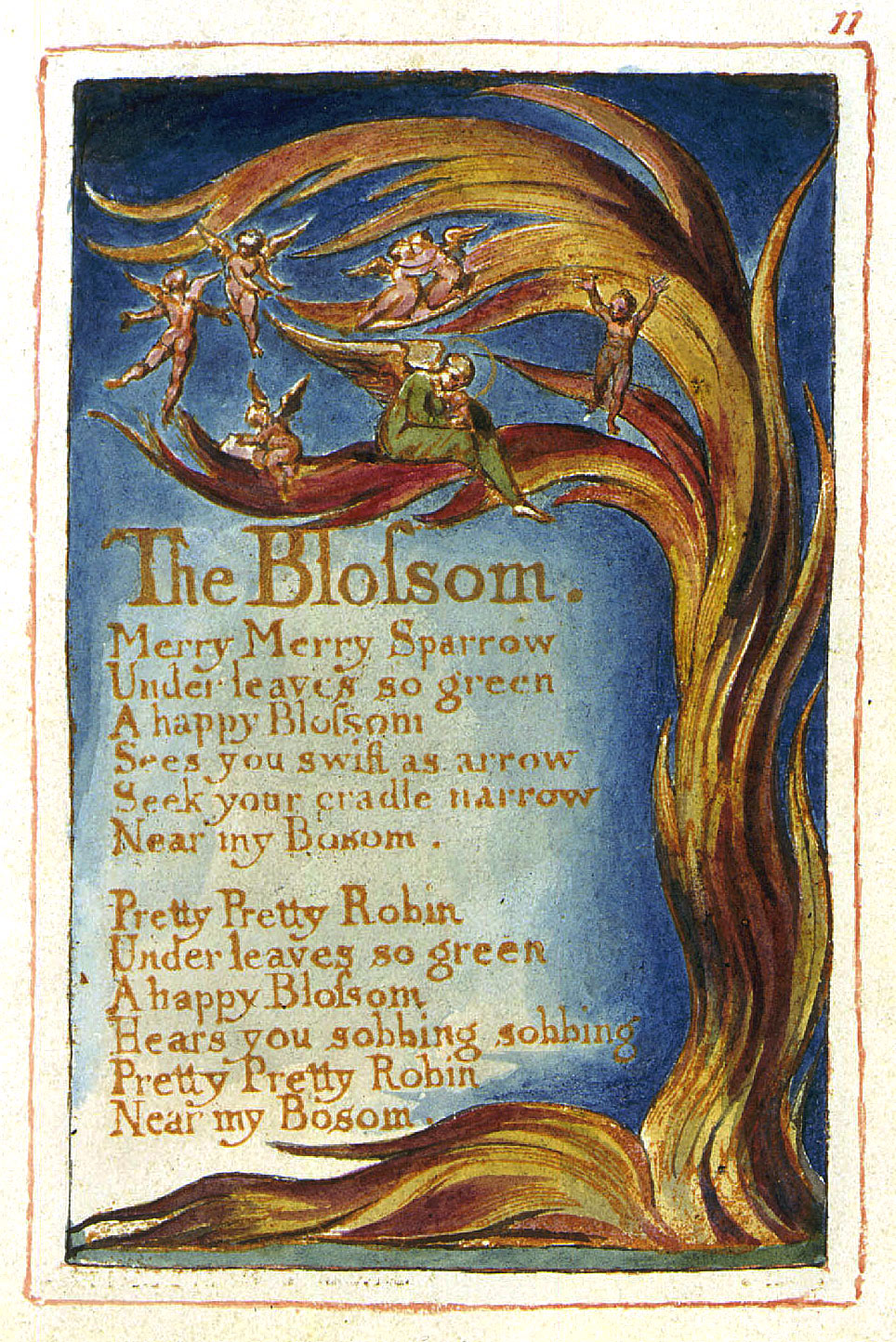
Songs of Innocence and of Experience, copy Z, 1826 (Library of Congress) object 11

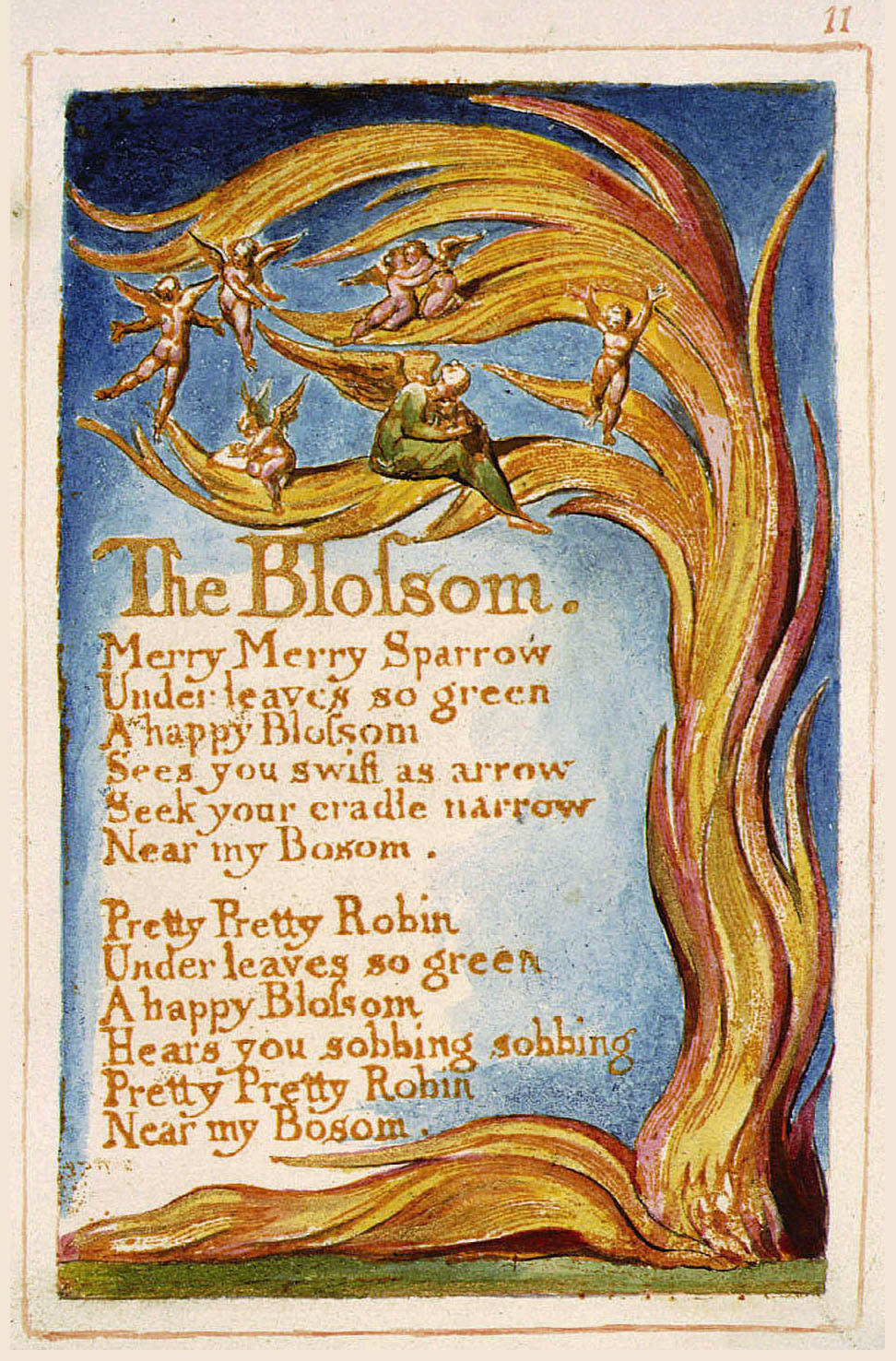
Songs of Innocence and of Experience, copy AA, 1826 (The Fitzwilliam Museum) object 11

== Sources ==
- Gardner, Stanley. Blake's Innocence and Experience Retraced. New York: St. Martin's, 1986.
