= Little Girl Lost =

Little Girl Lost may refer to:

== Television ==
- "Little Girl Lost" (Castle), a 2009 episode
- "Little Girl Lost" (The Littlest Hobo), a 1979 episode
- "Little Girl Lost" (The Twilight Zone), a 1962 episode
- "Little Girl Lost", an episode of the TV series Mannix
- "Little Girl Lost", an episode of the TV series Bonanza
- "Little Girl Lost", an episode of the TV series Wagon Train
- "Little Girl Lost", an episode of the television series Cold Case Files
- "Little Girl Lost", an episode segment of the series Night Gallery, based on Tubb's short story below
- "Little Girl Lost", an episode of the television series The Inside
- "Little Girl Lost", an episode of the television series Superman: The Animated Series
- Little Girl Lost (film), a 1988 television movie
- Little Girl Lost: The Delimar Vera Story, a 2008 television movie

== Music ==
- "Little Girl Lost", a 1972 song by Kris Kristofferson from the album Border Lord

== Literature ==
- "Little Girl Lost", a short science fiction story by Edwin Charles Tubb
- Little Girl Lost, the debut novel by Richard Aleas (pseudonym of Charles Ardai)
- "A Little Girl Lost", a 1794 poem by William Blake
- "The Little Girl Lost", another 1794 poem by William Blake
- Little Girl Lost, an autobiography by American actress Drew Barrymore
