= Infant Joy =

Poem by William Blake

- by William Blake
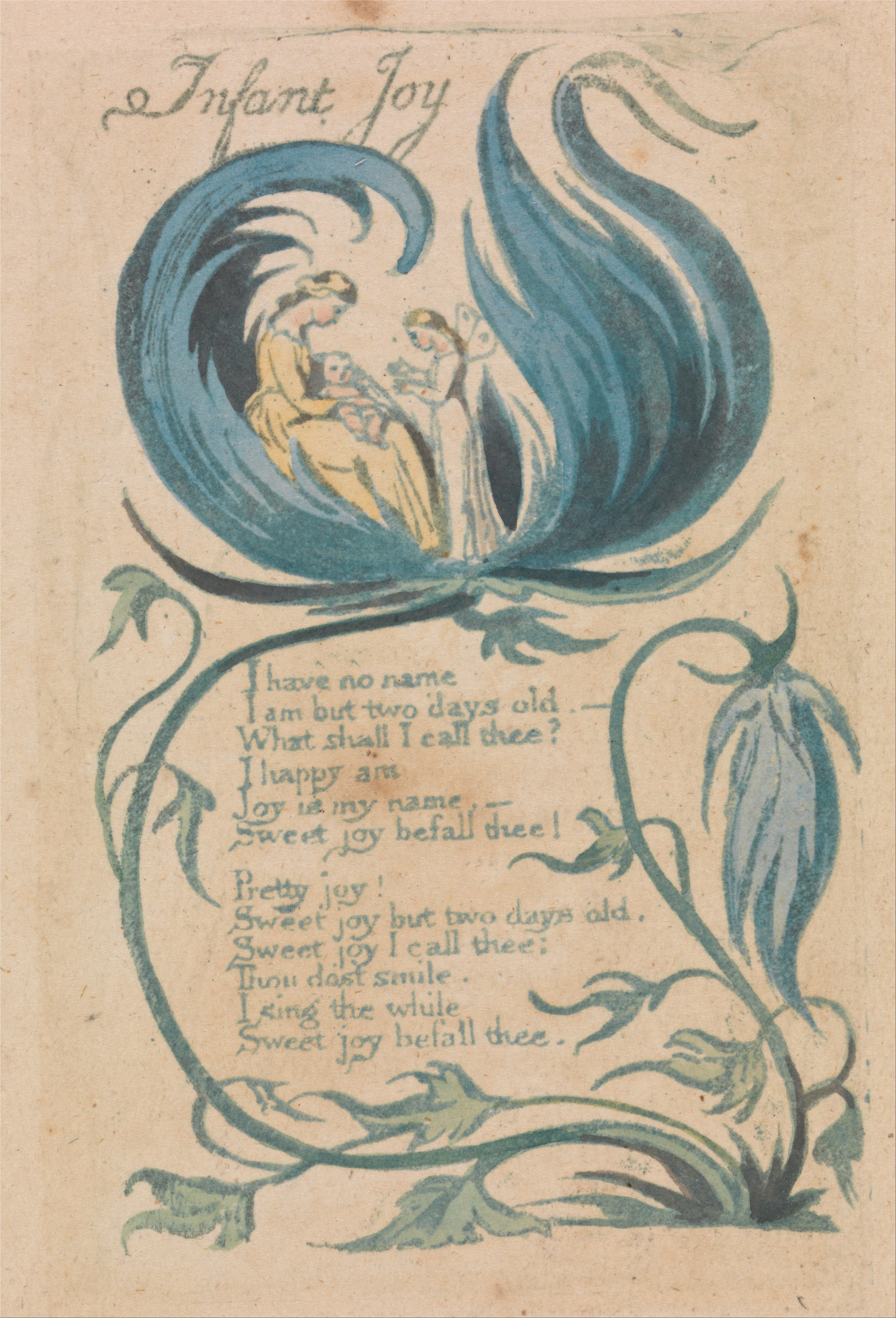
- 1789 edition

Full text
- Infant Joy at Wikisource

"Infant Joy" is a poem written by the English poet William Blake. It was first published as part of his collection Songs of Innocence in 1789 and is the counterpart to "Infant Sorrow", which was published at a later date in Songs of Experience in 1794.

Ralph Vaughan Williams set the poem to music in his 1958 song cycle Ten Blake Songs.

The band {Blake} set this poem to music on their album Heathen & Heaven, released in 2025.

== The poem ==
I have no name
I am but two days old.—
What shall I call thee?
I happy am,
Joy is my name,—
Sweet joy befall thee!

Pretty joy!
Sweet joy but two days old,
Sweet joy I call thee;
Thou dost smile.
I sing the while
Sweet joy befall thee.

== Description ==
Both "Infant Joy" and "Infant Sorrow" use two stanzas; however, "Infant Sorrow" uses a regular AABB rhyme scheme for both stanzas; whereas, ‘Infant Joy’ uses ABCDAC for the first stanza, and ABCDDC for the second. The most marked pattern in ‘Infant Joy’ is the double rhyme repeated in lines three, six, nine, and twelve, this pattern contrasts with the more insistent rhymes found in "Infant Sorrow".

The two stanzas and their contrasting speakers, use repetition with variation link many of the other 'Songs of Innocence' poems, demonstrating what critic Heather Glen called the "difference yet harmony between the two speakers."

== Analysis ==
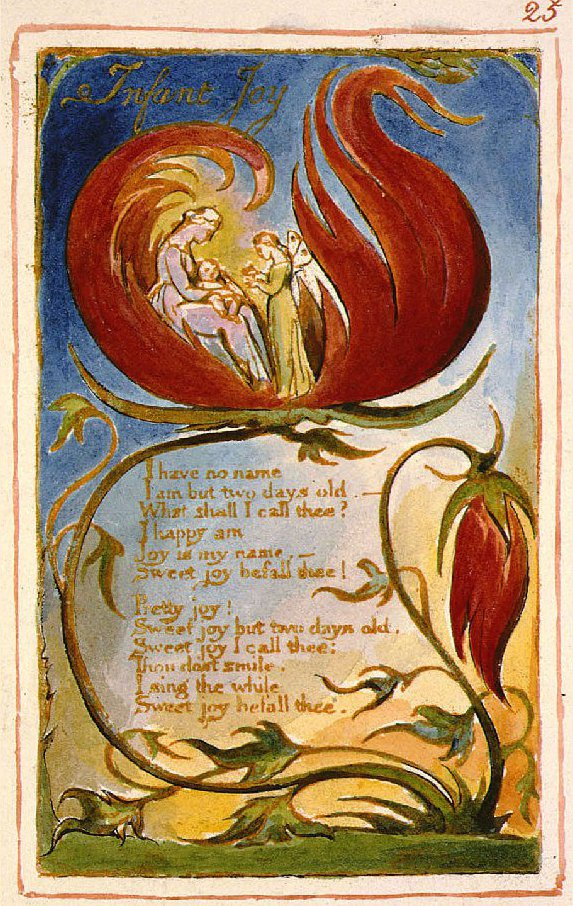
Copy AA of William Blake's hand painted print of "Infant Joy". This copy, printed and painted in 1826, is currently held by the Fitzwilliam Museum.

Critic Jennifer Waller describes the accompanying illustration adding meaning to the poem, saying "a twining vine bearing flamboyant flowers, suggesting passion and sexuality[;] the lower leaves of the plant are angular and strained and suggest a hint of impending experience." Thus, for Waller "origins of the scene" lie in "the simplicity of domestic love through the expressions of frank sexuality".

Autonomy and selfhood center the relationship of the poem's two speakers, taking up Blake's common thematic emphasis on the nature of the "self". Critic Heather Glen describes the second stanza as showing a very real experience in which a "child's sense of autonomous selfhood appears within a relationship of mutual joy." Glen compares the autonomy the mother fosters in "Infant Joy" with that created by the Nurse in "Nurse's Song", where care and love for the child must be relinquished because the "child will eventually go its own separate way".
