= On Another's Sorrow =

Poem by William Blake

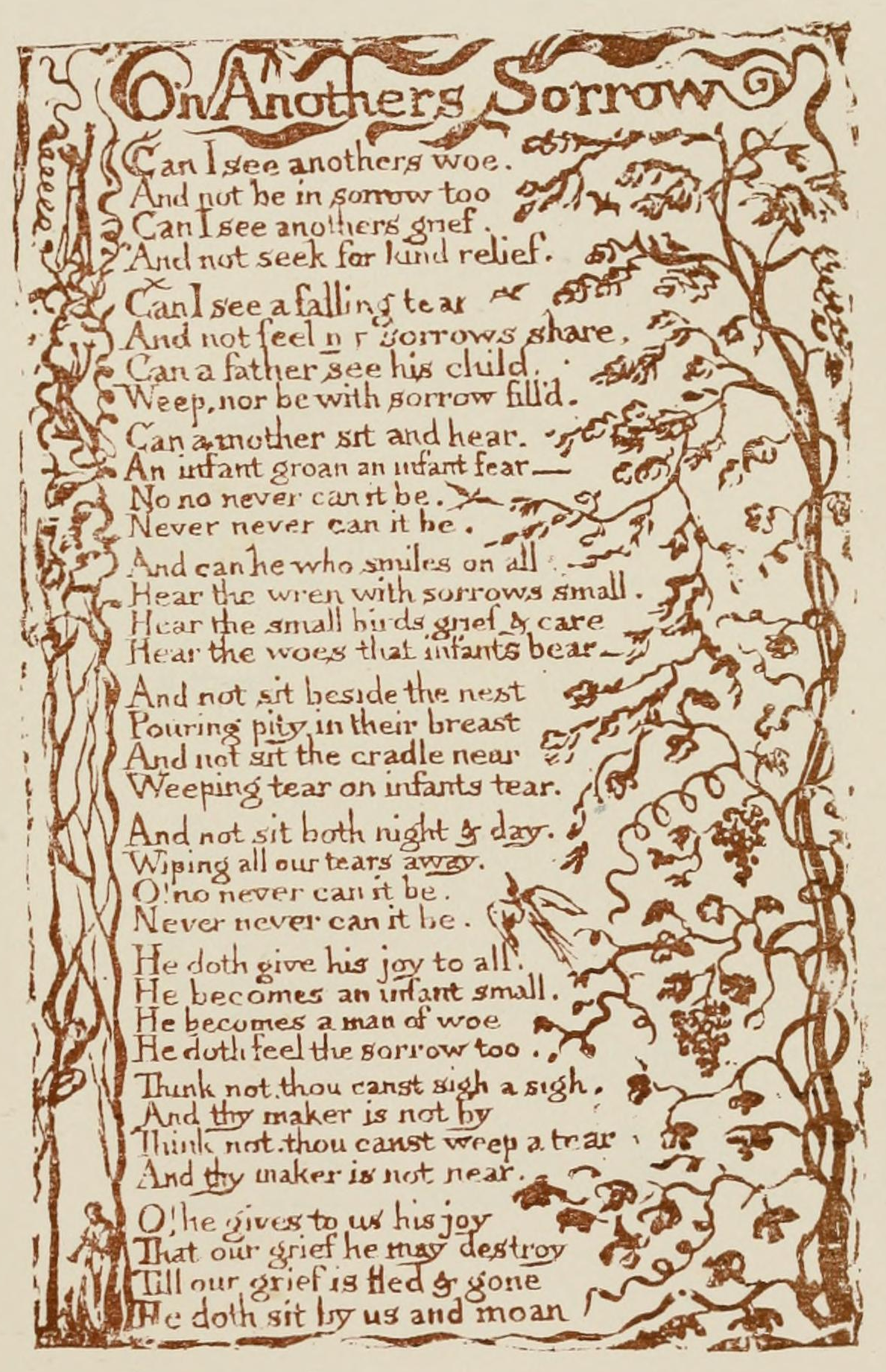
Original plate illustrating "On Another's Sorrow"

"On Another's Sorrow" is a poem by the English poet William Blake. The poem discusses human and divine empathy and compassion. It was published as part of the Songs of Innocence and of Experience in 1789 as the last song in the Songs of Innocence section.

Blake argues that human sympathy is a valuable trait. After making this observation about man he then speaks of the sympathy of God, as well. In his commentary on the poem, D. G. Gillham notes that though Blake discusses the nature of God, he attempts to do so in a rational way without referring to the supernatural.

The poem is one of the few entries in Songs of Innocence and of Experience that contains an explicit declaration of innocence. It is also the only poem in the volume that is in Blake's own voice.

== Poems ==
Can I see anothers woe,
And not be in sorrow too.
Can I see anothers grief,
And not seek for kind relief.

Can I see a falling tear,
And not feel my sorrows share,
Can a father see his child,
Weep, nor be with sorrow fill’d.

Can a mother sit and hear
An infant groan an infant fear —
No no never can it be.
Never never can it be.

And can he who smiles on all
Hear the wren with sorrows small,
Hear the small birds grief & care,
Hear the woes that infants bear —

And not sit beside the nest
Pouring pity in their breast.
And not sit the cradle near
Weeping tear on infants tear.

And not sit both night & day,
Wiping all our tears away.
O! no never can it be.
Never never can it be.

He doth give his joy to all.
He becomes an infant small.
He becomes a man of woe
He doth feel the sorrow too.

Think not, thou canst sigh a sigh,
And thy maker is not by.
Think not, thou canst weep a tear,
And thy maker is not near.

O! he gives to us his joy,
That our grief he may destroy
Till our grief is fled & gone
He doth sit by us and moan
