= Night (Blake poem) =

Illuminated poem by William Blake

"Night" is a poem in the illuminated 1789 collection Songs of Innocence by William Blake, later incorporated into the larger compilation Songs of Innocence and of Experience. It tells of the coming of evil when darkness arrives, as angels protect the sheep from impending dangers.

Songs of Innocence was written by William Blake in 1789 as part of his Illuminated Books. Blake's aim for his Songs was to depict the two contrary states of human existence: innocence and experience. The Songs speak upon the "innocence" of being a child and the "experience" gained over a lifetime. The Songs are separated into ten different objects, with each object offering a different situation and how it is viewed from a child's perspective.

== Background ==
Blake was a non-conformist. He opposed the British monarchy and aligned his thoughts with Thomas Paine and Mary Wollstonecraft. Blake was an advocate for using the imagination over natural observations. He believed ideal forms should arise from inner visions.

Blake's Songs of Innocence is an illuminated anthology first printed in 1789. Each poem contains an etched illustration by Blake, combining his poetry with intricate drawings. Songs of Innocence is a lyric collection that depicts an idyllic world before adulthood, where the spirit of children is still religiously pure. In some of the poems in this work, such as "The Chimney Sweeper" and "The Little Black Boy", Blake uses irony and rhetoric to portray the corruption of innocence in youth. Songs of Innocence were later combined with Blake's Songs of Experience, becoming Songs of Innocence and Experience and bringing the total number of poems in the work to thirty-one. The two collections were printed combined as well as separately from 1794.

== Summary ==
=== Poem ===
Farewell green fields and happy groves.
Where flocks have took delight;
Where lambs have nibbled, silent moves
The feet of angels bright;
Unseen they pour blessing,
And joy without ceasing,
On each bud and blossom,
And each sleeping bosom.
...
And there the lions ruddy eyes,
Shall flow with tears of gold:
And pitying the tender cries,
And walking round the fold:
Saying: wrath by his meekness
And by his health, sickness,
Is driven away,
From our immortal day.

And now beside thee bleating lamb,
I can lie down and sleep;
Or think on him who bore thy name,
Graze after thee and weep.
For wash'd in lifes river,
My bright mane for ever,
Shall shine like the gold,
As I guard o'er the fold.

— Stanzas 2, 5, 6

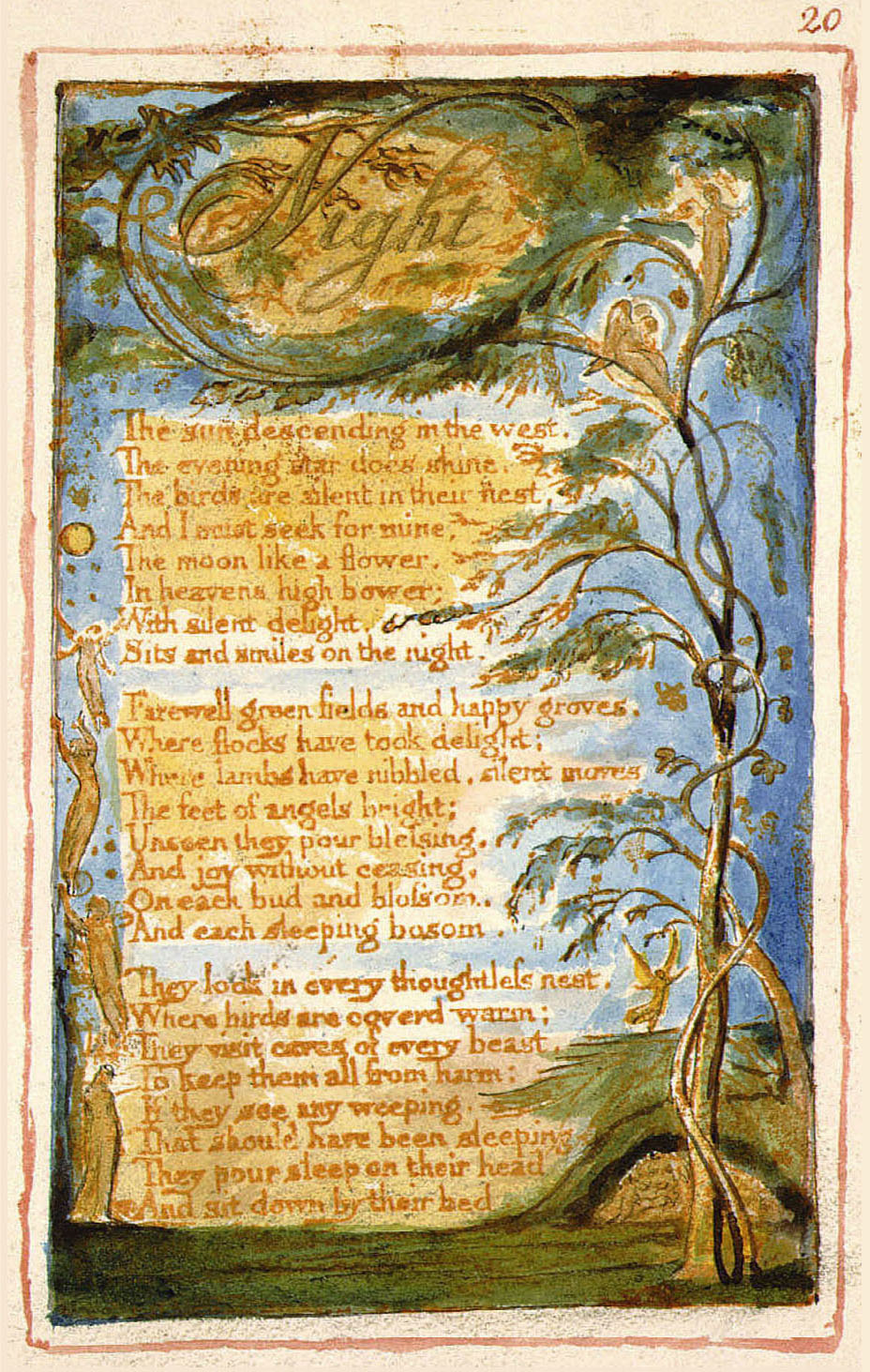
Copy AA of William Blake's hand painted print of "Night". This copy, printed and painted in 1826, is currently held by the Fitzwilliam Museum.

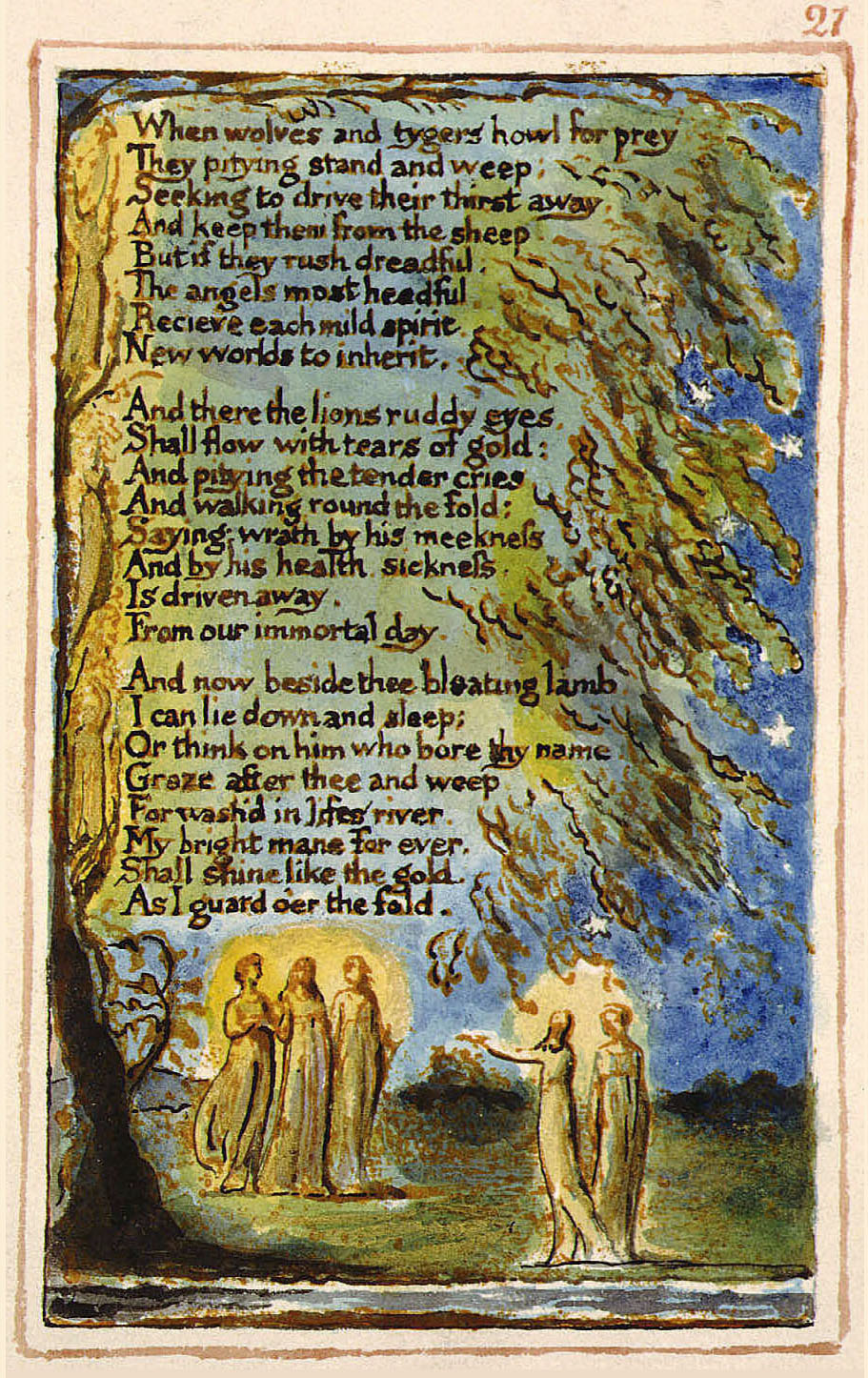
The second page of night from the same copy as the previous image.

Night is a poem that describes two contrasting places: Earth, where nature runs wild, and Heaven, where predation and violence are nonexistent. It is influenced by a passage from the Old Testament: Isaiah 11:6-8 "The wolf shall live with the lamb, the leopard shall lie down with the kid, the calf and the lion and the fatling together, and a little child shall lead them. The cow and the bear shall graze, their young shall lie down together; and the lion shall eat straw like the ox." In the poem, the first stanza describes a landscape with "the sun descending," when the world is settling quietly into night. Night has a positive connotation in this poem because the moon "sits and smiles on the night," showing how night is silent and peaceful. This is continued in stanza two, where angels tread where lambs had grazed, "pour[ing] blessing." The angels' duties are described in stanza three. Angels "visit caves" and "look in...nest[s]," keeping the animals safe and giving them sleep when the animals are mournful. Although the angels aim to keep all those under their care from harm, "wolves and tigers howl for prey" and threaten to ruin the angels' efforts. When these predators successfully attack their prey, the prey is received by the angels in Heaven, greeted with a better life. In Heaven, the lion is not a predator any more, but a guardian that is dedicated to serving God. He will lie down with the lamb, "pitying the tender," and worship the Lord

== Themes ==
An interpretation of Blake's "Night" is offered in D. G. Gillham's book William Blake published in 1966. Gillham explains how this poem gives divine beings a clear identity, unlike other poems in Songs of Innocence. The identity and actions of the angels show how all will be cared for after death. Gillham discusses the eternity described in the poem, where the lamb "can lie down and sleep" next to the lion. The eternity described is one in which man and animal will be cared for by a divine being. Gillham also points out how the divine eternity is an extension of the pleasures of the earthly world. He mentions how the lion still guards the lamb in "Heaven," showing that there is still some "unspecified disaster" that has not yet come to pass. This "new world" is similar to the earthly world and all its virtues.

Zachary Leader offers another interpretation in his book Reading Blake's Songs. Leader recognises that the poem does not try to "explain away" any of the suffering that those in the poem endure, suffering that does not sway the faith of the speaker. Leader argues that the poem suggests that earth contains "our angels and heavens," not a divine world. He claims that Blake uses the lion to show that heaven is earthly. The ruddy and crying eyes of the lion depict heaven as "a place of tears," showing that the world need not be transcended to achieve innocence. Leader's view is similar to Gillham's in that it argues Blake is showing that Heaven is more like earth than a different, new world.

In the book The Problematic Vision of Innocence: A View from Night, Norma Greco argues that the poem is not a "celebration of the ... harmony ... of Innocence." The speaker does not realise what redemption truly is, and experiences spiritual loss in his misconception of redemption. The apparent earth-like qualities of Heaven shows the misconceptions of Heaven by the speaker. The contrast between the poem and its illustrations show the "spiritual error" of the speaker. The first illustration is a large tree enveloping the words, while the second has five women at the bottom of the plate. This inclusion of people in the second drawing depicts the symbolic shift of the speaker towards a spiritual loss. Night is not celebrating innocence but is showing the ignorant misconceptions of Christian redemption.

Heather Glen's Vision and Disenchantment: Blake's Songs and Wordsworth's Lyrical Ballads argues that "Night" is an exploration of social anxiety. Society has "mutual reassurances," which provide comfort in worldly things and not Heaven or God. The wolves and tigers that appear at night threaten to disrupt the norms of society and create panic. She also mentions the concept of night being associated with faith. Blake was familiar with this concept, and she believes Blake used it in order to further emphasise the strong faith symbols and themes in the poem. Glen also discusses "Night" in relation to the other poems included in Blake's Songs of Innocence. She claims that the poem is written with other elements of various poems within Songs of Innocence. The use of these other elements provides a "formal resolution" for the works as a whole.

Edward Larrissy also mentions social anxiety in his book William Blake. He claims that "Night" focuses on "illusory comfort," which is closely aligned with the "mutual reassurances" mentioned by Glen. Although society may be comforted with material things, there is no comfort like that of Heaven. Larrissy states that the poem shows how looking for comfort in society, in worldly things, is "enslaving." Having this false sense of comfort leads to an unfulfilled life and a complete loss of innocence. The end of "Night" shifts its focus to God, showing that true comfort and salvation can only come from the supernatural.

The complexity of "Night" is addressed in Hazard Adams' William Blake: A Reading of the Shorter Poems. Adams claims that the poem is complex because of the speaker's push to join the natural and supernatural world together. These are two concepts that "to [a] child have never been apart," but for an adult, are much more difficult to join. The speaker wants to achieve a state of innocence that joins the natural and supernatural, one that is natural for a child, but unnatural of an adult who has lost his innocence. The speaker's frustration creates a tone of melancholy in the poem as he attempts to attain a higher state of innocence.

In Harold Bloom's interpretation of "Night," Bloom notes the melancholy tone of the poem Adams also mentioned in his interpretation of the poem. Bloom believes this melancholy is caused by the speaker's awareness of the delicate balance of innocence. The speaker realizes that the harmony of innocence can be easily corrupted. Bloom also acknowledges a "gentle irony" in the poem. In order to attain a higher state of innocence, you must separate the supernatural and the natural. In some literature, a natural state is argued to bring one closer to God or the supernatural. Instead of using nature as a way to grow closer to the supernatural or a higher being, Blake severs the natural and supernatural to show that one cannot be attached to both the natural and supernatural worlds.

== Criticism ==
Many poets have offered their criticism of Blake and his works. T. S. Eliot, a Nobel Prize–winning poet, had this to say about Blake and his Songs of Innocence: "The Songs of Innocence and of Experience, and the poems from the Rossetti manuscript, are the poems of a man with a profound interest in human emotions, and a profound knowledge of them. The emotions are presented in an extremely simplified, abstract form. This form is one illustration of the eternal struggle of art against education, of the literary artist against the continuous deterioration of language."

The poet Krystyna Kapitulka criticises "Night": "We have here, as it were, a reconciliation of day and night..." She also says that the images portrayed in the poem seems to "match nicely the atmosphere of a child's dream."
