= A Little Boy Lost =

Poem written by William Blake

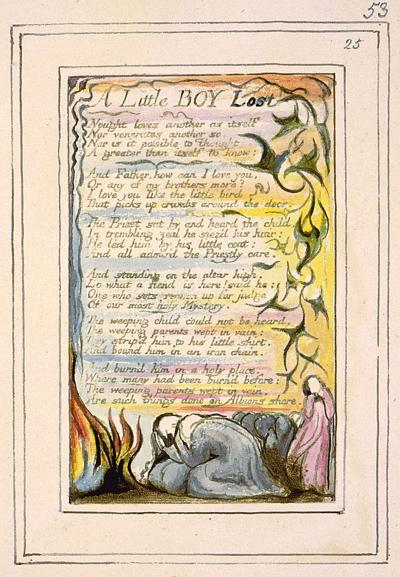
The poem: A Little Boy Lost

"A Little Boy Lost" is a poem of the Songs of Experience series created in 1794 after the Songs of Innocence (1789) by the poet William Blake. The poem centres on the theme of religious persecution and the corrupted dictates of dogmatic Church teachings. As part of Songs of Experience the poem is set in the wider context of exploring the suffering of innocent and oppressed individuals—in this case a young boy, and his parents—within a flawed society that is oppressed and disillusioned with life's experience.

== The poem ==
Nought loves another as itself
Nor venerates another so.
Nor is it possible to Thought
A greater than itself to know:

And Father, how can I love you,
Or any of my brothers more?
I love you like the little bird
That picks up crumbs around the door.

The Priest sat by and heard the child.
In trembling zeal he seiz'd his hair:
He led him by his little coat:
And all admir'd the Priestly care.

And standing on the altar high,
Lo what a fiend is here! said he:
One who sets reason up for judge
Of our most holy Mystery.

The weeping child could not be heard.
The weeping parents wept in vain:
They strip'd him to his little shirt.
And bound him in an iron chain.

And burn'd him in a holy place,
Where many had been burn'd before:
The weeping parents wept in vain.
Are such things done on Albions shore.

== Analysis ==
The poem is divided into six quatrains, all in iambic tetrameter. The first quatrain The second quatrain is the much simpler speech of a little boy expressing his thoughts on love of God, of others, and of nature.

=== First quatrain ===
Blake says that it is impractical to assume that one can love something, or someone, more than themselves; and that something unprovable (the divine) cannot supersede knowledge itself. The language is highly stylised.

=== Second quatrain ===
A little boy, the titular character, continues the first quatrain by likening love of God to the love of the abstract, or any love that cannot be reciprocated, i.e. " the little bird". He asks the priest how God can be loved more than any other.

=== Rest of the poem ===
The priest denounces the boy as a heretic for his pondering, claiming him to be a "fiend" for questioning the logic and sensibility of divine worship, with support from the audience. The weeping child and his parents can do nothing as he is tied and burned at the stake.

This occurs even though the child's age—he is a little boy, after all; he sees the world through the eyes of a child's innocence—should preclude him from comprehending the awful construing of his words (by the Priest) as heresy. On the other hand, a reader might theorise that Blake intends to portray the child as precocious and with intentions to dissent from Church teaching—perhaps the Priest thinks so. However, the actual words applied by the author to the boy's speech offers very little toward this view; instead, it is the child's innocent candour that seems to inspire his words.

== Background ==
It appears the author has drawn the “Priest” as not merely a parish priest but as metaphor for the hierarchical powers-that-be of the Church. Certainly Blake seems to hearken back to the time when the Church wielded almost unchecked powers throughout England (and most of Europe) to judge and destroy anyone it deemed intolerable in thought or behaviour.

It has been said that Blake "wrote his poetry for the common man".
