= The Garden of Love (poem) =

Poem by William Blake

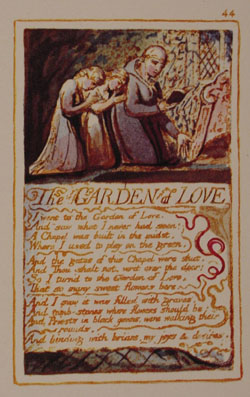
Original plate and artwork by William Blake

"The Garden of Love" is a poem by the Romantic poet William Blake. It was published as part of his collection, Songs of Experience.

== Poem ==
I went to the Garden of Love,
And saw what I never had seen:
A Chapel was built in the midst,
Where I used to play on the green.

And the gates of this Chapel were shut,
And ‘Thou shall not’ written over the door;
So I turned to the Garden of Love,
That so many sweet flowers bore.

And I saw it was filled with graves,
And tomb-stones where flowers should be:
And Priests in black gowns were walking their rounds,
And binding with briars, my joys & desires.

== Composition ==
The first two stanzas of the poem are written in a loose anapestic trimeter and rhyme acbc. The third stanza begins in the same way, but the last two lines of this stanza make a sharp break with the form of the preceding stanzas. These concluding lines are written in trimeter, and they fail to maintain the acbc rhyme scheme. Instead the lines rhyme internally (gowns/rounds and briars/desires). These abrupt changes in versification serve to dramatize the changes that have taken place in this "Garden of Love."

Blake was a master of lyrical poetry, and one cannot understand him without pausing to appreciate such elements as the careful placement of capital letters, the deliberate hiccups in rhythm (lines 4 and 6), and the disorder that comes with line 11 as the previous order of trimeter suddenly tumbles into chaos with the force of the sudden tetrameter/pentameter (depending upon individual interpretation of rhythm). These last two lines suggest a previously ordered world tumbling into disorder.

== Theme and interpretation ==
William Blake was unorthodox in his views on theology, but at the same time heavily influenced by orthodox religion, as his art attests. He was deeply disturbed by poverty, child labor, prostitution, and hypocrisy of Church and oppressive nature of government. Understanding this about his personality serves one well in dissecting his poetry. One reading on "The Garden of Love" is that it was written to express Blake's beliefs on the naturalness of sexuality and how organised religion, particularly the Christian church of Blake's time, encouraged repression of natural desires.

If this is what Blake intended, it would have been a brave statement to make in his time due to the implied sexual reference, but much of the poetry of Blake and his contemporaries contained critique of the Church of England's hierarchical structure and influence on government. Blake's indignation at his subject matter is evident from the second line as he is talking about seeing "what I had never seen". He says he has "never" seen it although he must have grown up all his life being very aware of the Church's attitude towards sexuality. It can then perhaps be inferred that he is speaking from the point of view of innocence who has just entered the world of experience and is in a state of shock and sadness at how his previous freedoms have been blocked and squashed by the Church. "A chapel was built in the midst/ Where I used to play on the green" The "green" has special significance also as it mirrors the contrary poem in innocence "The Echoing Green" hence the reading of the "green" to represent previous, innocent freedom, as well as the more obvious "play".

A more common, alternate reading – and one more in keeping with what is known about Blake, his education and politics, and the times in which he lived – is that the poem simply reflects his views that the Church was an oppressor of free thought. Blake wrote the Songs of Innocence collection to reflect the innocence into which each human is born. Songs of Experience – from which this poem is drawn – points to the effects on the inherent innocence possessed by all, by the oppression of government and church, the Industrial Revolution, and lack of child labor regulations amongst the other things of the coming modernism.
