= Songs of Innocence and of Experience =

Book by William Blake

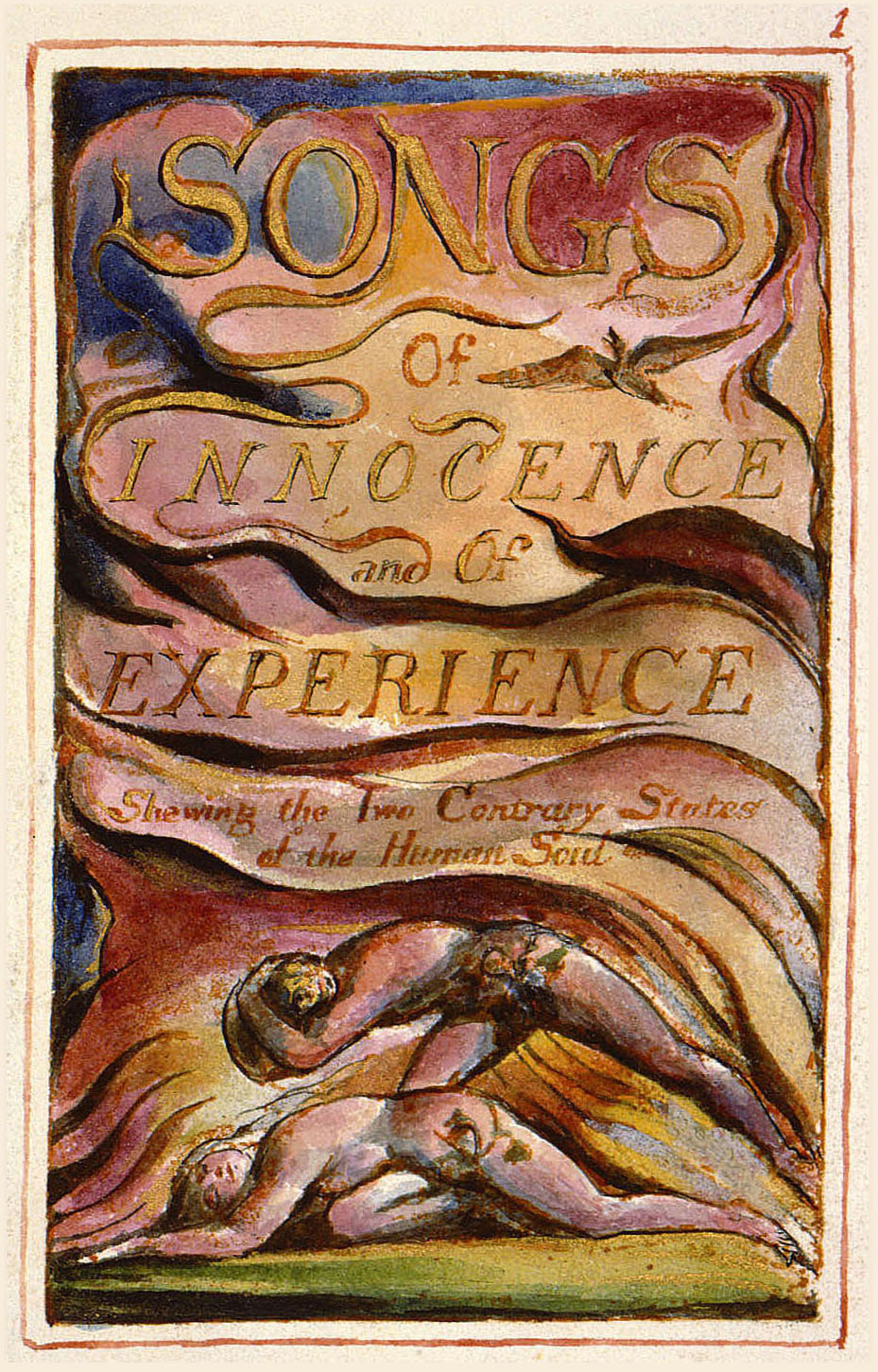
Songs of Innocence and of Experience Shewing the Two Contrary States of the Human Soul title page

Songs of Innocence and of Experience is a collection of illustrated poems by William Blake. Originally, Blake illuminated and bound Songs of Innocence and Songs of Experience separately. It was only in 1794 that Blake combined the two sets of poems into a volume titled Songs of Innocence and of Experience Shewing the Two Contrary States of the Human Soul. Even after beginning to print the poems together, Blake continued to produce individual volumes for each of the two sets of poetry.

Blake was also a painter before the creation of Songs of Innocence and of Experience and he engraved, hand-printed, and coloured detailed art to accompany each of the poems in Songs of Innocence and of Experience. This unique art helps tell the story of each poem, and was part of Blake's original vision for how each poem should be understood. Blake was heavily inspired by children's literature and juvenile education in his creation of Songs of Innocence and of Experience, and his analysis of childhood as a state of protected innocence rather than original sin, but not immune to the fallen world and its institutions, would soon become a hallmark of Romanticism.

Notably, there has been an abiding relationship between Songs of Innocence and of Experience and musical artists. Poems from the collection have been set to music by a variety of musicians.

== Songs of Innocence ==
Songs of Innocence was originally a complete collection of 23 poems first printed in 1789. Blake etched 31 plates to create the work and produced an estimated seventeen or eighteen copies. This collection mainly shows happy, innocent perception in pastoral harmony, but at times, such as in "The Chimney Sweeper" and "The Little Black Boy", subtly shows the dangers of this naïve and vulnerable state.

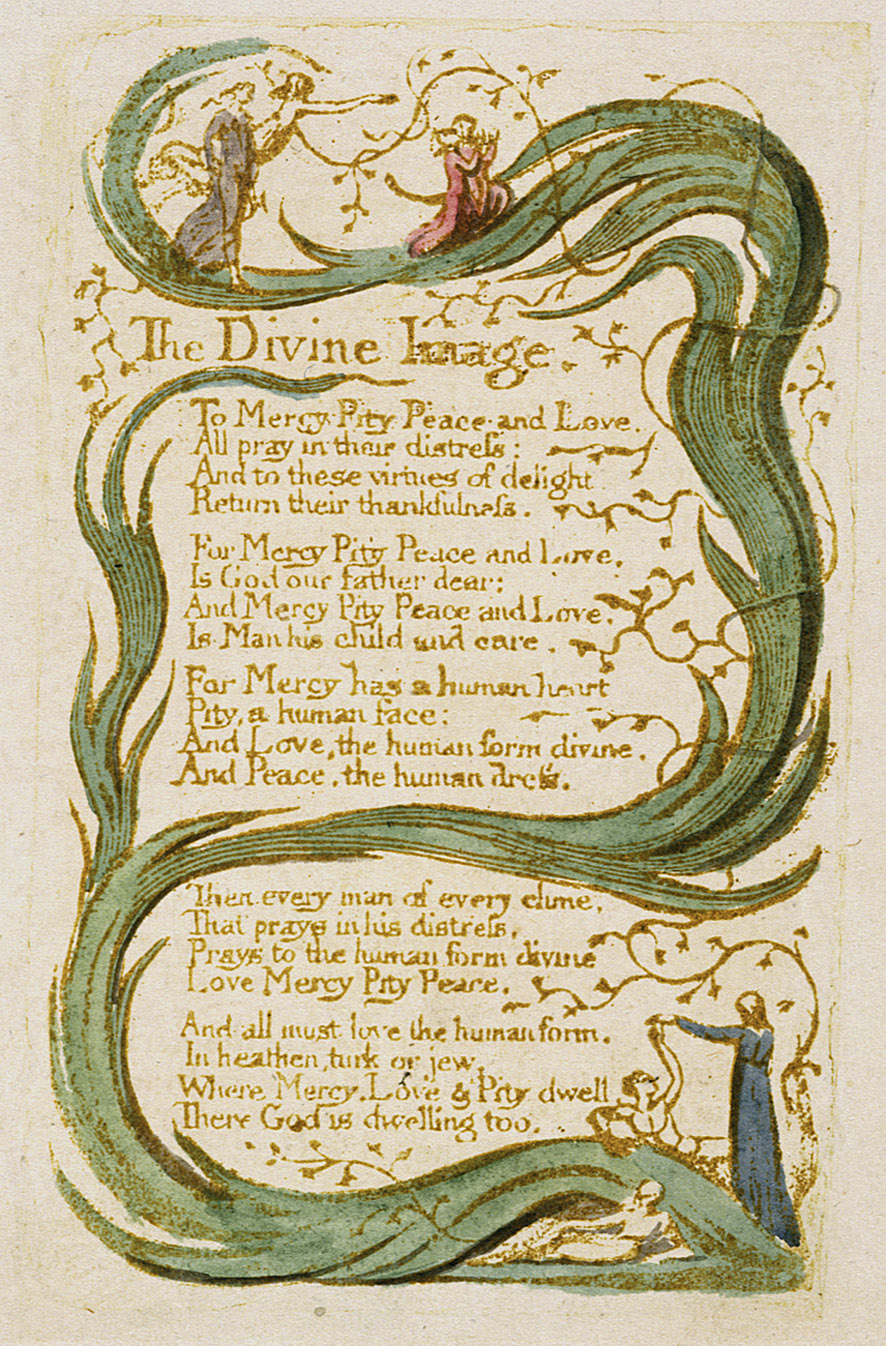
Copy G of The Divine Image held at the Yale Center for British Art and printed in 1789

The poems are listed below:

- Introduction
- The Shepherd
- The Echoing Green
- The Lamb
- The Little Black Boy
- The Blossom
- The Chimney-Sweeper
- The Little Boy Lost
- The Little Boy Found
- Laughing Song
- A Cradle Song
- The Divine Image
- Holy Thursday
- Night
- Spring
- Nurse’s Song
- Infant Joy
- A Dream
- On Another’s Sorrow
- The School Boy
- The Little Girl Lost
- The Little Girl Found
- The Voice of the Ancient Bard

== Songs of Experience ==
Songs of Experience is a collection of 26 poems forming the second part of Songs of Innocence and of Experience. The poems were published in 1794 (see 1794 in poetry). Some of the poems, such as "The Little Girl Lost" and "The Little Girl Found", were moved by Blake to Songs of Innocence and were frequently moved between the two books. (Note: See the various extent editions republished in their original publication order at the William Blake Archive.)

The poems are listed below:

- Introduction
- Earth's Answer
- The Clod and the Pebble
- Holy Thursday
- The Chimney Sweeper
- Nurse's Song
- The Sick Rose
- The Fly
- The Angel
- The Tyger
- My Pretty Rose Tree
- Ah! Sun-flower
- The Lilly
- The Garden of Love
- The Little Vagabond
- London
- The Human Abstract
- Infant Sorrow
- A Poison Tree
- A Little Boy Lost
- A Little Girl Lost
- A Divine Image
- A Cradle Song
- To Tirzah
- The School Boy
- The Voice of the Ancient Bard

== Illustrations ==
Blake was known for his skill as an artist and print-maker in addition to his poetry, and he combined these talents when creating Songs of Innocence and Experience. Each page of Songs of Innocence and of Experience contains the text of the poem surrounded by a unique illustration. Blake individually illustrated these pages for each binding he did of the collection. Blake combined several strategies to create each unique illustration. He would create a relief-etched copper printing plate by hand, then paint each page after printing using a variety of mediums, including watercolor. This process meant that each printing of Songs of Innocence and of Experience was visually distinct from the one that came before.

Blake confessed in a letter that Songs of Innocence and Experience was an attempt to combine the "painter and the Poet." The illustrations in Songs of Innocence and of Experience do more than simply depict what is in the poem. They serve to intensify and translate the poems and are central to a full understanding of what each poem attempts to convey. The meaning of several of the poems is changed by the illustrations that accompany them, with notable examples including "The Blossom" and the first plate of "The Little Girl Lost".

Some of Blake's illustrations have occasionally been critiqued for errors or lack of realism. Notable examples include inconsistent coloring of the rose appearing in the illustration of The Sick Rose and the appearance of the tiger in "The Tyger".

== Musical settings ==
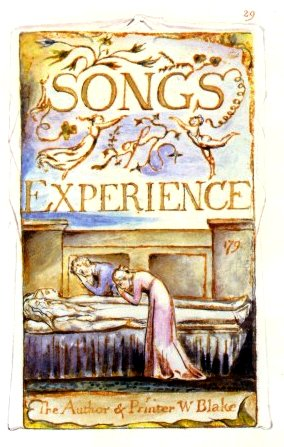
Blake's title plate (No. 29) for Songs of Experience

Poems from both books have been set to music by many composers, including Ralph Vaughan Williams, Joseph Holbrooke, John Frandsen, Per Drud Nielsen, Sven-David Sandström, Benjamin Britten, and Jacob ter Veldhuis. Individual poems have also been set by, among others, John Tavener, Victoria Poleva, Jah Wobble, Tangerine Dream, Jeff Johnson, and Daniel Amos. A modified version of the poem "The Little Black Boy" was set to music in the song "My Mother Bore Me" from Maury Yeston's musical Phantom. The folk musician Greg Brown recorded sixteen of the poems on his 1987 album Songs of Innocence and of Experience and by Finn Coren in his Blake Project.

The poet Allen Ginsberg believed the poems were originally intended to be sung, and that through study of the rhyme and metre of the works, a Blakean performance could be approximately replicated. In 1969, he conceived, arranged, directed, sang on, and played piano and harmonium for an album of songs entitled Songs of Innocence and Experience by William Blake, tuned by Allen Ginsberg (1970).

American composer and producer David Axelrod produced two solo albums, Song of Innocence (1968) and Songs of Experience (1969) which were homages to the mystical poetry and paintings of William Blake.

The composer William Bolcom completed a setting of the entire collection of poems in 1984. In 2005, a recording of Bolcom's work by Leonard Slatkin, the Michigan State Children's Choir, and the University of Michigan on the Naxos label won four Grammy Awards: Best Choral Performance, Best Classical Contemporary Composition, Best Classical Album, and Best Producer of the Year (classical).

Electronic rock group Tangerine Dream based their 1987 album Tyger on lyrics by William Blake.

The composer Victoria Poleva completed Songs of Innocence and of Experience in 2002, a chamber cycle on the verses by Blake for soprano, clarinet and accordion. It was first performed by the ensemble Accroche-Note of France.

American composer and lyricist William Finn wrote a 2005 song cycle titled Songs of Innocence and Experience, commissioned by Williams College for the opening of its '62 Center for Theatre and Dance. Rather than setting Blake's poems directly, it borrows the collection's title and theme to explore the relationship between teachers and students, drawing on Finn's own undergraduate years at the college.

Irish rock group U2 released an album called Songs of Innocence in 2014, and followed it in 2017 with Songs of Experience.

American singer-songwriter Bob Dylan mentioned the Songs of Experience in his song "I Contain Multitudes" in his Rough and Rowdy Ways (2020) album.

The French band called {Blake} have set the entire Songs of Innocence and of Experience to music. They will finish to release their anthology en 2027, for the bicentenary of William Blake's death.

== Facsimile editions ==
The Huntington Library and Art Gallery in San Marino, California, published a small facsimile edition in 1975 that included sixteen plates reproduced from two copies of Songs of Innocence and of Experience in their collection, with an introduction by James Thorpe. The songs reproduced were "Introduction", "Infant Joy", "The Lamb", "Laughing Song" and "Nurse's Song" from Songs of Innocence, and "Introduction", "The Clod & the Pebble", "The Tyger", "The Sick Rose", "Nurses Song" and "Infant Sorrow" from Songs of Experience. Tate Publishing, in collaboration with The William Blake Trust, produced a folio edition containing all of the Songs of Innocence and Experience in 2006. A colour plate of each poem is accompanied by a literal transcription, and the volume is introduced by critic and historian Richard Holmes.

William Blake, Songs of Innocence and of Experience edited with an introduction and notes by Andrew Lincoln, and select plates from other copies. Blake's Illuminated Books, vol. 2. William Blake Trust / Princeton University Press, 1991. Based on King's College, Cambridge, copy, 1825 or later.

Songs of Innocence, Dover Publications, 1971. Based on copy of Lessing J. Rosenwald Collection, Library of Congress, Copy B, ca. 1790.

Songs of Experience, Dover Publications, 1984. Based on "a rare 1826 etched edition," per back cover.

== See also ==
- Auguries of Innocence – Poem by William Blake
