= A Dream (Blake poem) =

Poem by English poet William Blake

"A Dream" is a poem by English poet William Blake. The poem was first published in 1789 as part of Blake's collection of poems entitled Songs of Innocence.

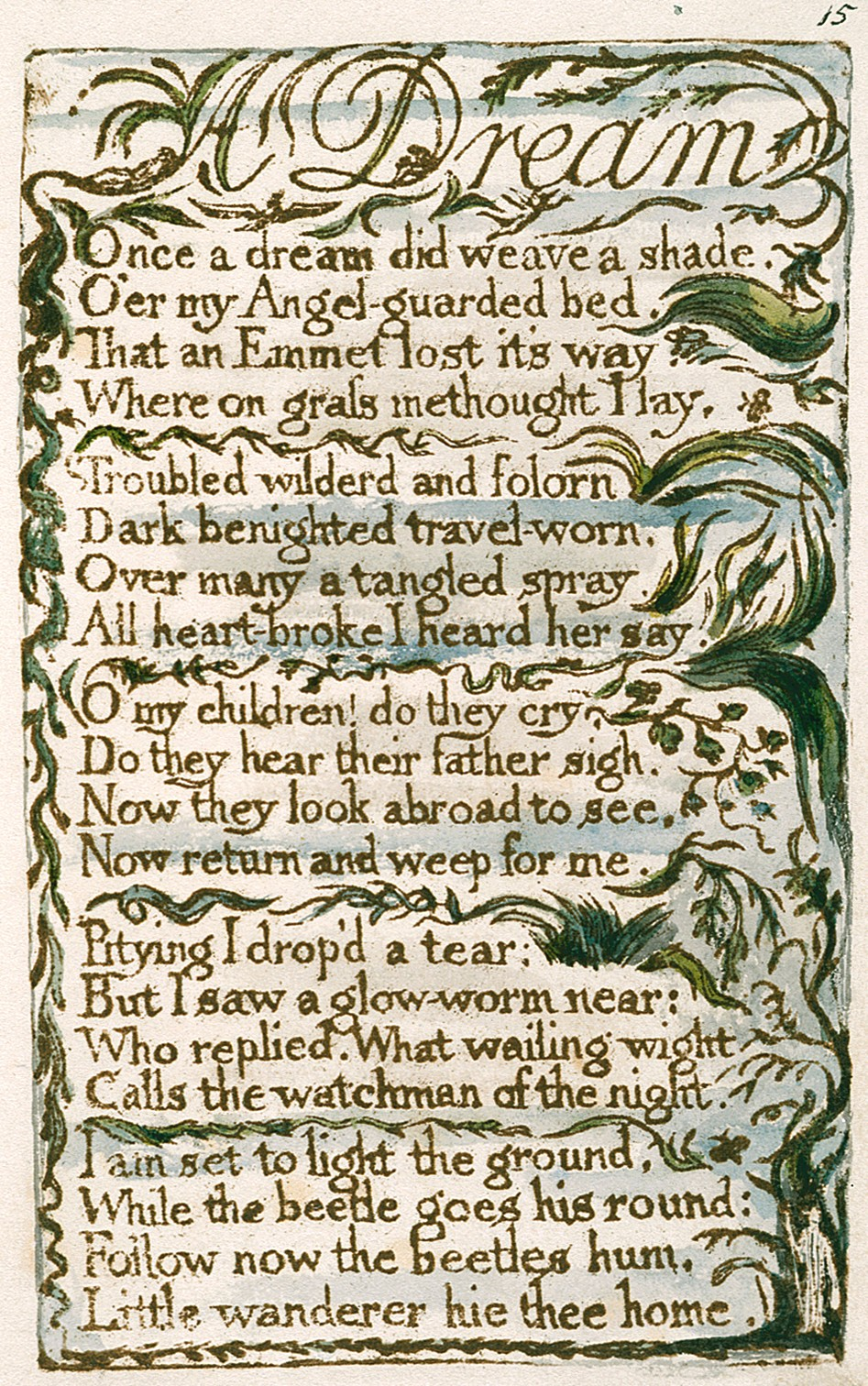
A 1795 hand painted version of "A Dream" from Copy L of Songs of Innocence and of Experience currently held by the Yale Center for British Art

== Background ==
Songs of Innocence is a collection of 19 illustrated poems published in 1789. According to scholar Donald A. Dike, the collection does not “describe an absolute state of being or fashion an autonomous truth.” Rather, he says the poems are resistant, being “consciously against something and trying to see their way through something.”

Songs of Innocence was followed by Blake's Songs of Experience in 1794. The two collections were published together under the title Songs of Innocence and of Experience, showing the "two contrary states of the human soul.”

== The poem ==
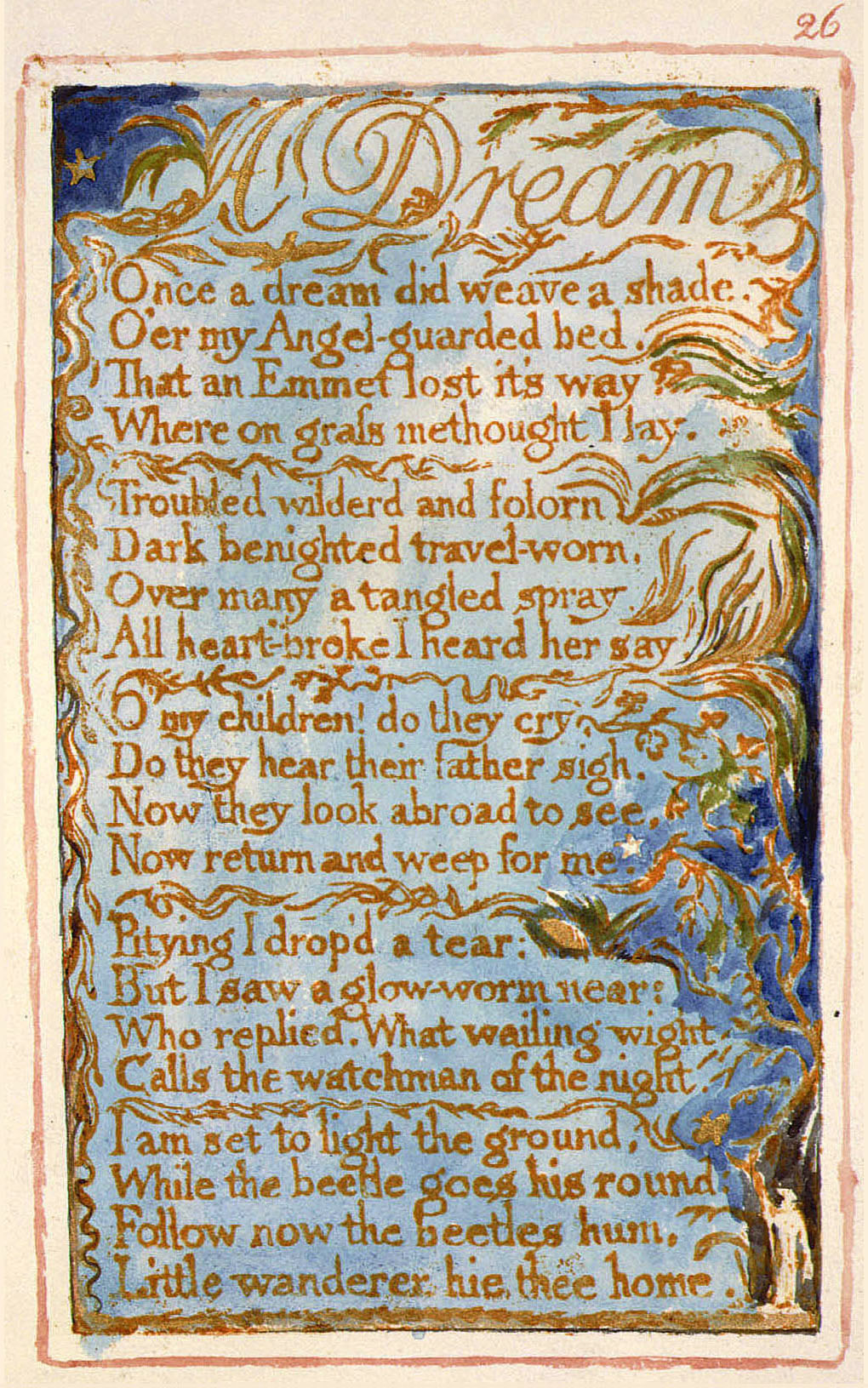
An 1826 version of "A Dream" from Copy AA of Songs of Innocence and of Experience currently held at The Fitzwilliam Museum.

Once a dream did weave a shade,
O'er my Angel-guarded bed,
That an Emmet lost it's way
Where on grass methought I lay.

Troubled wilderd and forlorn
Dark benighted travel-worn,
Over many a tangled spray
All heart-broke I heard her say.

O my children! do they cry
Do they hear their father sigh.
Now they look abroad to see,
Now return and weep for me.

Pitying I dropp'd a tear:
But I saw a glow-worm near:
Who replied. What wailing wight
Calls the watchman of the night.

I am set to light the ground,
While the beetle goes his round:
Follow now the beetles hum,
Little wanderer hie thee home.

== Structure and summary ==
In this poem, Blake portrays the concepts of the return to innocence from experience. No wonder the artist thought first of including it in “Songs of Experience” at first, finally deciding to move it back to “Songs of Innocence” (according to the Blake Digital Text Project). The theme of the child who is lost and later found is also present in the character of the Emmet (ant) who is given the privilege of capitalisation to show its personification; also in the ant's children, and even maybe in the narrator's person. There is a strong presence of the natural world, very much admired by Blake, and his means toward mysticism, notably in contrast with Wordsworth's “’atheistic’ love of nature” (Kazin 35). Also, the concept of guidance and protection appears through the text in different forms, as a means to return to a lost innocence.

== Themes and critical analysis ==
Isabelle Keller-Privat describes “A Dream” as a piece that, like other Songs of Innocence poems, “emphasizes the interconnections between the actors, the voices and the rhythms that give the poem its coherence and harmony.” This coherence and harmony give the poem its sense of innocence. The world of this poem is portrayed as friendly and the characters are helpful. Yet a hint of experience can also be felt in “A Dream” through the emmet's fear of its surroundings and its tired, damaged appearance. The emmet has experienced hardship and separation beyond the innocence of the dream.

Dike writes that, by putting the dream's concerns into the world of an insect, Blake extends the “usual limits of sympathy.” Resolution is found for the emmet through cooperation with the other characters of the dream. According to Dike, this introduces the theme that everyone is imperfect and needs help because the emmet requires the assistance of the narrator's sympathy, the glow-worm's rescue, and the beetle's guidance.

=== Maternity plot ===
Harriet Kramer Linkin explores the inverted maternity plot present in "A Dream." In many of the poems in Songs of Innocence, Blake portrays mothers as nurturing and protective. However, as Linkin writes, in "A Dream" the "inversion of a popular narrative of idealized maternity pointedly suggests that the domestic ideology is nothing more than a fantasy of Generation." Rather than a father returning to his waiting wife and children, the mother is the one returning to her husband and children at home. This maternity plot in "A Dream" follows a trend of absent mothers in other Songs of Innocence poems. According to Linkin, Blake "attends to the problematic institution of a domestic ideology that restructures the middle-class family."
