= The Shepherd (poem) =

Poem by William Blake

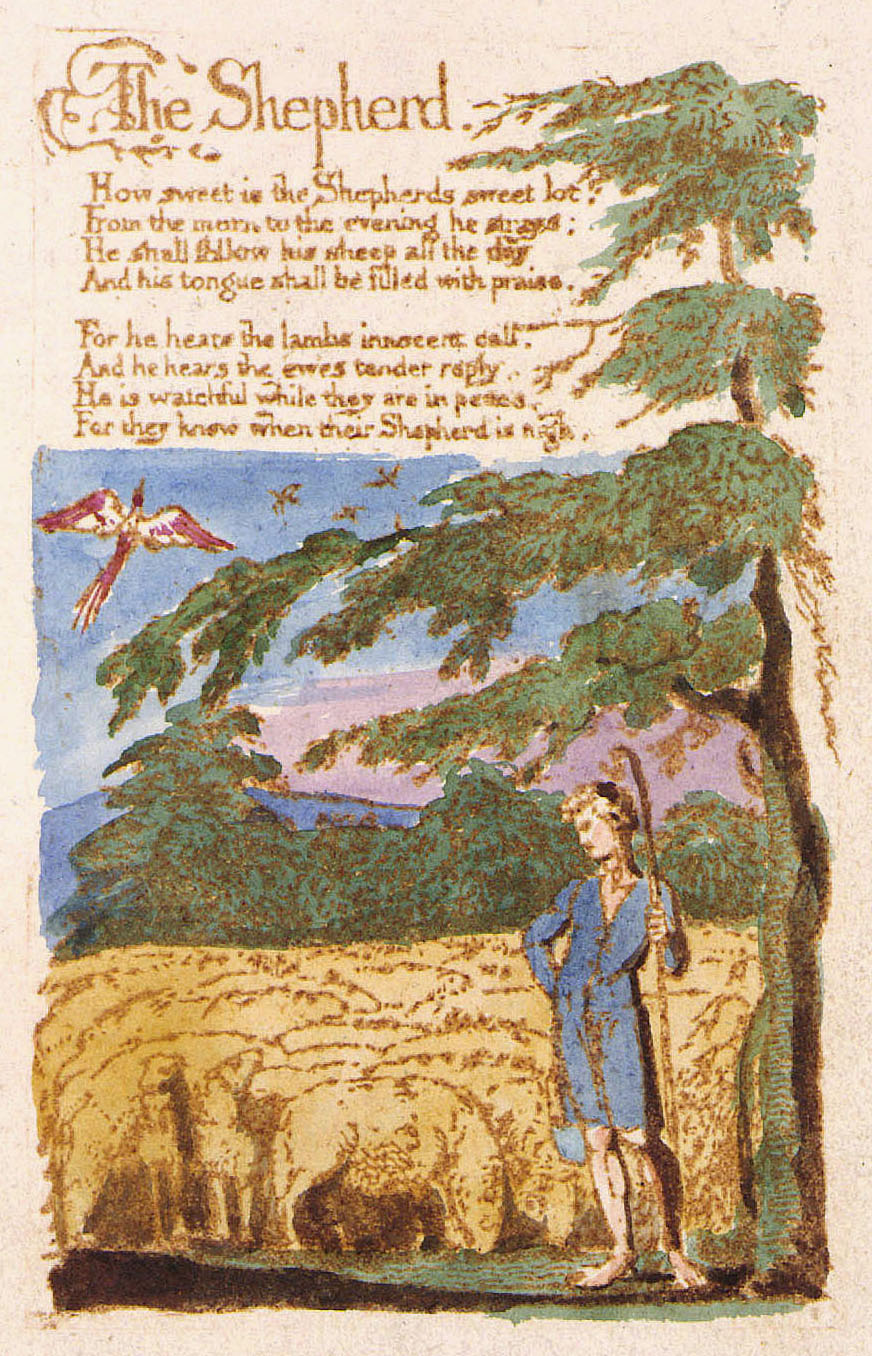
Copy B of William Blake's hand-painted print of "The Shepherd". This copy, printed and painted in 1789, is currently held by the Library of Congress.

"The Shepherd" is a poem from William Blake's Songs of Innocence (1789). This collection of songs was published individually four times before it was combined with the Songs of Experience for 12 editions which created the joint collection Songs of Innocence and of Experience (1794). Blake produced all of the illuminated printings himself beginning in 1789. Each publication of the songs has the plates in a different order, and sixteen other plates were published posthumously.

Ralph Vaughan Williams set the poem to music in his 1958 song cycle Ten Blake Songs.

The french band {Blake} set this poem to music on their album Here & Now, released in 2026.

== Poem ==
A recording of "The Shepherd"

How sweet is the Shepherds sweet lot,
From the morn to the evening he strays:
He shall follow his sheep all the day
And his tongue shall be filled with praise.

For he hears the lambs innocent call,
And he hears the ewes tender reply,
He is watchful while they are in peace,
For they know when their Shepherd is nigh.

== Critical analysis ==
This poem is one of the three pastoral poems in Songs of Innocence, the other two being The Lamb and Spring. This poem is written from the Piper's perspective. This can be seen in the repetition of the word 'sweet' in the first line which the Piper uses in the other poems of his narration. This repetition may also be read as a subtle irony about the Shepherd's lack of agency as he follows his herd rather than leading them through the fields. The Little Boy Full of Joy that is depicted in Spring, grows into the shepherd of The Lamb, and then completes his journey through life as The Shepherd in this poem. In the first stanza, The Shepherd is full of joy which mirrors the innocent nature of this collection of poems. In the second stanza, The Shepherd is presented as a caring and protective force over his herd. This can be seen in his listening for the call and reply of the ewe and lamb in the second stanza. Readers from Blake's time would have found it odd that The Shepherd was following his herd. Blake allows the voice of the poem to speak for itself rather than revealing a firm interpretation. The Shepherd's relationship to his flock is further explored in the final lines of the poem. When he is present, the herd remains calm and peaceful.

There are also religious connotations in this poem. The image of The Shepherd as Christ is initially found in another Song, "The Little Black Boy". Psalm 23 depicts God as a shepherd of mankind, and the capitalization of the word 'Shepherd' in the first and last lines furthers the idea that the Shepherd is a symbol of God. In the Bible, a shepherd's presence is representative of guidance. In this poem, the Shepherd can be viewed as the spiritual guide or a savior of the herd, rejoicing in their numbers. Jesus is also referred to in the Bible as the Lamb of God. Since the poem depicts The Shepherd as following his herd, the reader may view both the sheep and The Shepherd as protectors of each other. The Shepherd watches over his herd with delight as God watches over his people. Reversed, Jesus - represented as a lamb - does not lead mankind - The Shepherd - astray.

== Illustration ==
The Shepherd in the illustration is standing underneath a vine-wrapped tree surrounded by his herd of sheep. In many of the Songs of Innocence, Blake uses vegetation to show the security of innocence that is secure and unthreatened. This dove underneath the poem mimics the dove found on the introduction plate. Typically a symbol of peace, the dove enables the reader to absorb the peaceful setting that is typical of a pastoral poem. Depending on the version, the sun appears to either be rising or setting. The rising sun gives the impression of new beginnings that is consistent with innocence while the setting sun encourages the reader to view the poem as the end of a journey through innocence and onto experience.

== Sources ==
- Gardner, Stanley (1986). Blake's Innocence and Experience retraced. London: Athlone Press. ISBN 0-312-08354-8.
- Leader, Zachary (1981). Reading Blake's Songs. Boston: Routledge & Kegan Paul. ISBN 0-7100-0635-7.
- Glen, Heather (1983). Vision and Disenchantment:Blake's Songs and Wordsworth's Lyrical Ballads. Cambridge University Press. ISBN 9780521271981.
- Blake, William (2005). Songs of innocence and of experience. Stilwell, KS: Digireads.com Pub. ISBN 1-4209-2580-6.
- Larrissy, Edward (1985). William Blake (1. publ. ed.). Oxford, Oxfordshire, UK: B. Blackwell. ISBN 0-631-13485-9.>
