= Laughing Song =

1789 poem by William Blake

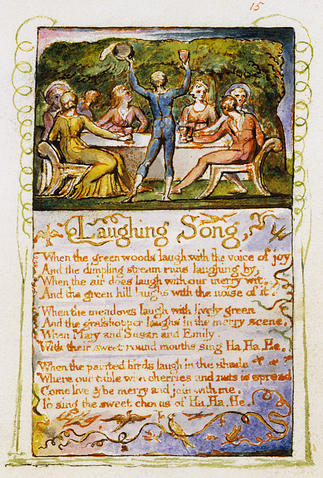
- "Laughing Song" by William Blake is from his collection of poems Songs of Innocence

Laughing Song by William Blake

"Laughing Song" is a poem published in 1789 by the English poet William Blake. This poem is one of nineteen in Blake's collection Songs of Innocence.

== Poem ==
When the green woods laugh with the voice of joy
And the dimpling stream runs laughing by,
When the air does laugh with our merry wit,
And the green hill laughs with the noise of it.

When the meadows laugh with lively green
And the grasshopper laughs in the merry scene,
When Mary and Susan and Emily,
With their sweet round mouths sing Ha, Ha, He.

When the painted birds laugh in the shade
Where our table with cherries and nuts is spread
Come live & be merry and join with me,
To sing the sweet chorus of Ha, Ha, He.

== Analysis of the poem ==
"Laughing Song" is a lyric poem, written in three stanzas of four-beat lines, rhyming AABB. The title of this poem and its rhyme scheme is very appropriate for the message that Blake is trying to convey. The title in itself states that this is a song about laughter, and the three stanzas give this impression, especially in the final line of the second stanza: "With their sweet round mouths sing 'Ha, Ha, He.' ", and the final line of the third stanza: "To sing the sweet chorus of 'Ha, Ha, He.' "

Using words like "sing" and "chorus" for emphasis, Blake sets out to lure readers to the happiness of prelapsarian times, when things were unspoiled and innocent. Blake is inviting the readers to take part in the celebration; after all nature and all the people have begun to laugh and be merry, he wants all to come join in the song. In the idea of prelapsarian/postlapsarian times, he knows that this great joy will not last forever. The poem begins with the laughter and happiness of nature in the first stanza, personifying the wood, hills, and air. In the second stanza, Blake gradually goes on to the "grasshopper" and "Mary and Susan and Emily," the children who will also join in the singing of the "Ha, Ha, He." The children and grasshopper also reiterate the idea of innocence and joy. Repetition of the words "merry" and "laughs/laughing" also emphasises the overall tone of the poem.

== Illustration ==
The illustration shows what Blake was trying to express. It shows an outdoor gathering or celebration in which all are one with nature, and laugh with the trees as expressed in the poem. The colours in the image are vibrant, and the border of birds adds a joyous touch.
