= A Cradle Song =

1789 poem by William Blake

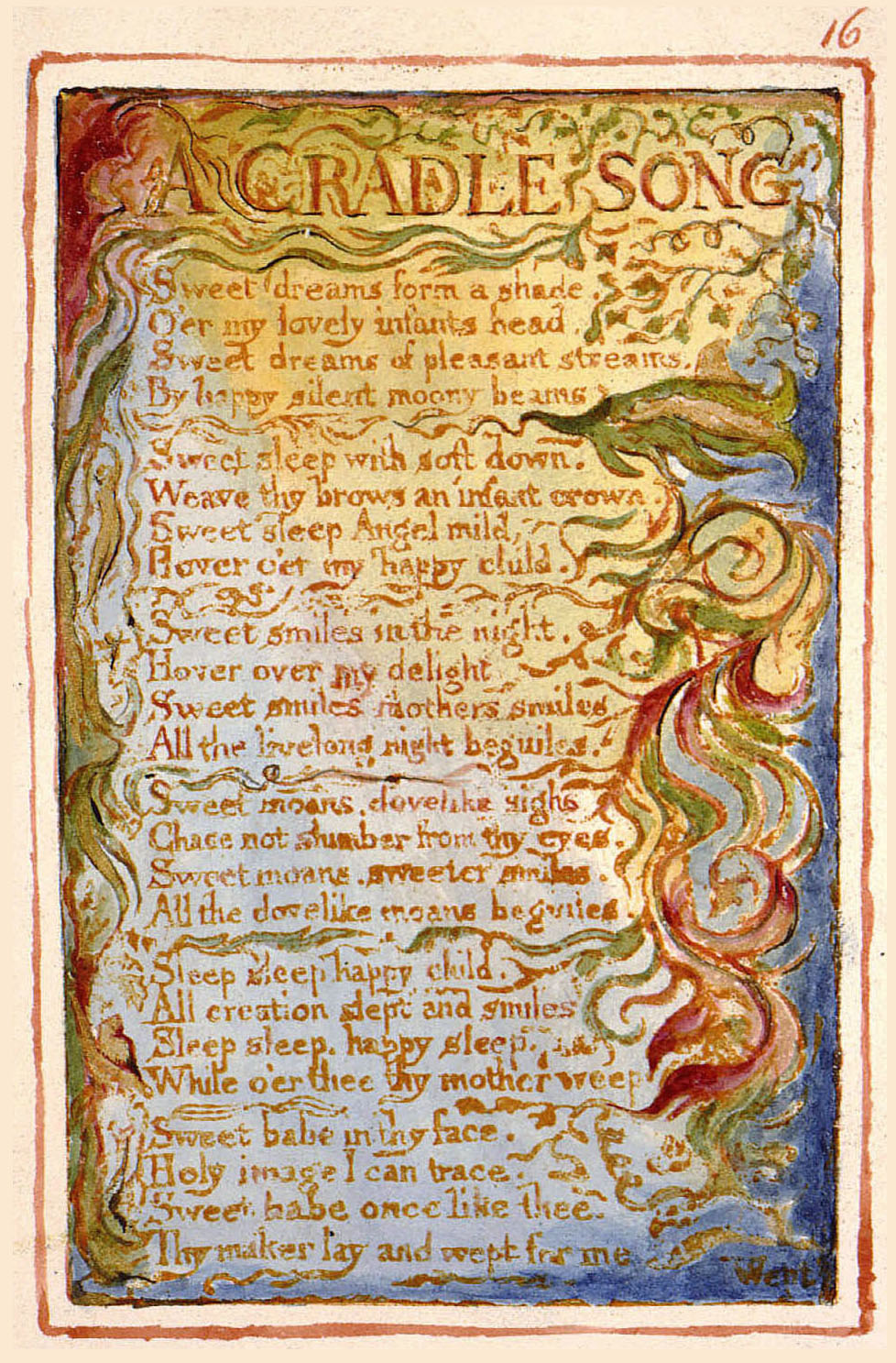
Illustrated "A Cradle Song" in William Blake's Songs of Innocence

"A Cradle Song" is a poem written by William Blake in 1789, as part of his book Songs of Innocence.

== Poem ==
Sweet dreams form a shade
O’er my lovely infants head.
Sweet dreams of pleasant streams,
By happy silent moony beams

Sweet sleep with soft down,
Weave thy brows an infant crown.
Sweet sleep Angel mild,
Hover o’er my happy child.

Sweet smiles in the night,
Hover over my delight.
Sweet smiles Mothers smiles
All the livelong night beguiles.

Sweet moans, dovelike sighs,
Chase not slumber from thy eyes,
Sweet moans, sweeter smiles,
All the dovelike moans beguiles.

Sleep sleep happy child.
All creation slept and smil’d.
Sleep sleep, happy sleep,
While o’er thee thy mother weep

Sweet babe in thy face,
Holy image I can trace.
Sweet babe once like thee,
Thy maker lay and wept for me

Wept for me for thee for all,
When he was an infant small.
Thou his image ever see.
Heavenly face that smiles on thee.

Smiles on thee on me on all,
Who became an infant small,
Infant smiles are his own smiles,
Heaven & earth to peace beguiles.

== Structure ==
The 32-line poem is divided into 8 stanzas of 4 lines each. Each stanza follows an "AABB" rhyme scheme.

“A Cradle Song” follows a couplet structure where each pair of lines rhyme. This lends the poem a graceful sound and makes it easy to sing. While writing this poem, Blake drew from the image of a mother sitting over her infant while the baby is in her crib falling sleep.

== Background ==
Blake was born in London on November 28, 1757. He died on August 12, 1827. He claimed that in a dream his brother Robert taught him the printing method that he used in Songs of Innocence and other illuminated works. Songs of Innocence includes poems about children and the clash between the corruption of the world and the innocence of youth. He uses imagery throughout Songs of Innocence.

== Paraphrase ==
In “A Cradle Song”, a mother sings to her child, asking the infant to stay asleep. The mother asks her child to sleep through the night. While she looks at her infant's face, the mother sees Jesus. When she sees the infant smiling, she sees Jesus smiling at her and the world. At the end of the poem, she states how heaven and earth are at peace and have harmony when she sees her baby smile.

== Analysis ==
A key theme in “A Cradle Song” is the mother's love for her child. The mother uses the word “sweet” ten times in the poem. She makes the infant seem angelic by the way she describes the child. The mother claims her child is “dovelike”, using the dove as a symbol for holiness and love. The woman ties the spiritual world to the physical. She notes how she can trace His (Christ's) holy image on her baby. The mother tells the baby to sleep as she cries, representing how the mother is aware of the sinful world her baby will grow up and eventually die in. She claims how Jesus wept for all and wept for her. The mother has faith that her infant will be okay even when she can no longer protect her, but it still saddens her to not be able to shield her from the world.

== In music ==
There are famous artists that have claimed that they were inspired by William Blake, including Bob Dylan, John Lennon, and The Beatles, Bono and U2, Led Zeppelin, and many more. Some have even used Blake's poems in the creation of their music. In A Charm of Lullabies, Benjamin Britten sets "A Cradle Song" to music alongside four other poems.

The band {Blake} set this poem to music on their album Lost & Found, released in 2026
