= A Little Girl Lost =

Poem by William Blake

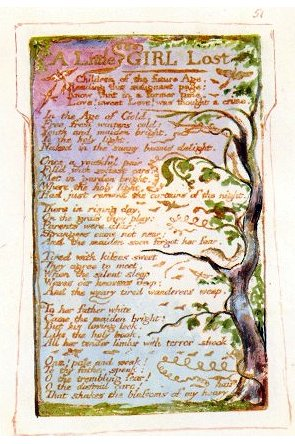
William Blake's original plate for A Little Girl Lost.

"A Little Girl Lost" is a poem written by the English poet William Blake. It was first published as part of his collection Songs of Innocence and of Experience in 1794. The poem is written as a clear authorial commentary from Blake, focusing on the tension between human passions and societal expectations.

== Critical concerns ==
In her analysis of the poem for the journal The Explicator, academic Katelin E. Trowbridge describes the poem's narratorial voice as a projection of "his own passionate voice" about the subject of pleasure and social expectations. Trowbridge focuses on the Girl's fall from innocence as one of the poem's critical moments, where she can experience the pleasures of sexual relations with her lover but in turn feels guilt when confronted by her father. The conflict between father's pressures and maiden's feelings allows Blake to "expose paternal tyranny masquerading as Christian love" while revealing "his own emotional reaction to the maiden's torment."
