= The Angel (Songs of Experience) =

Poem by William Blake

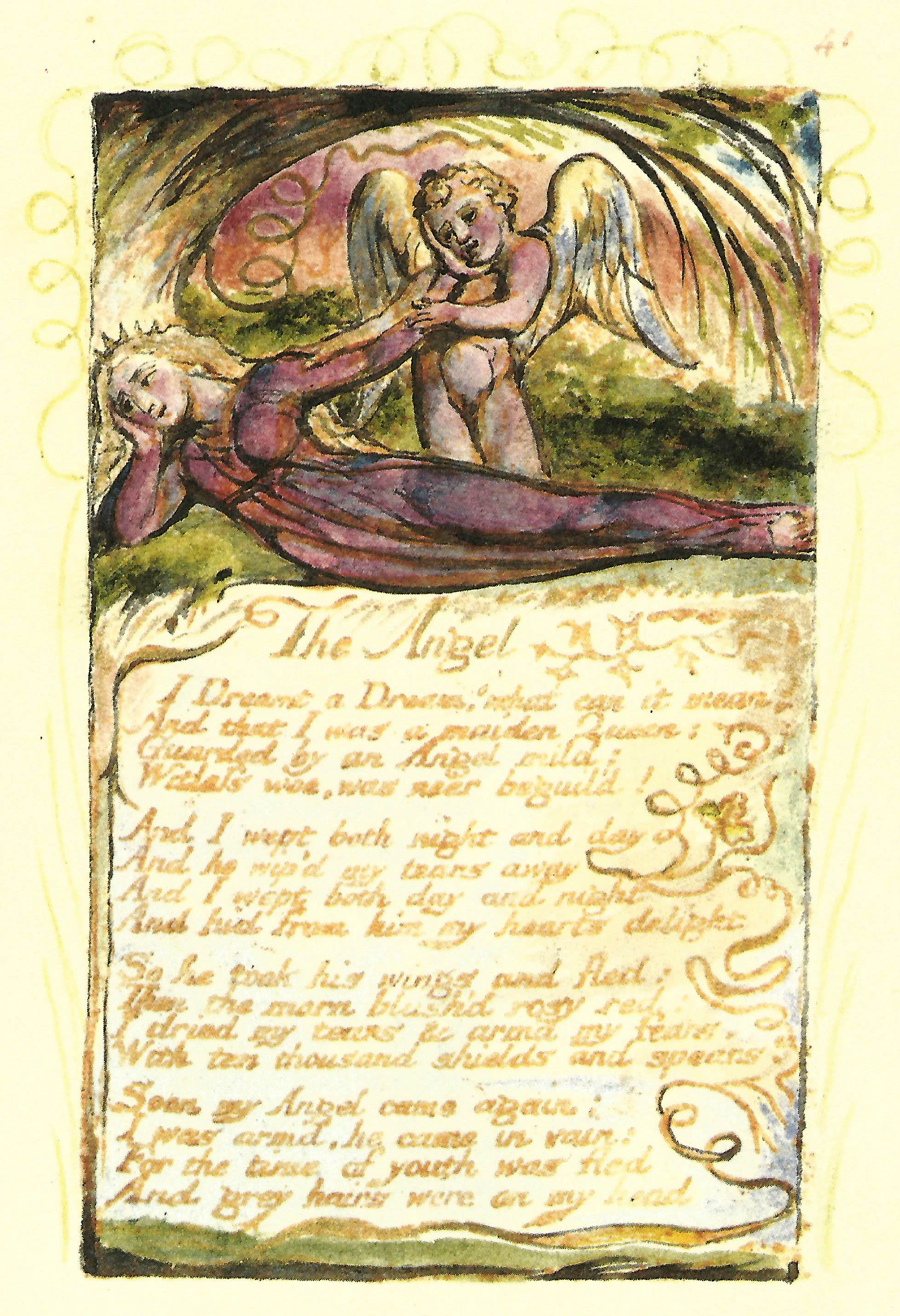
William Blake: The Angel. Copy W

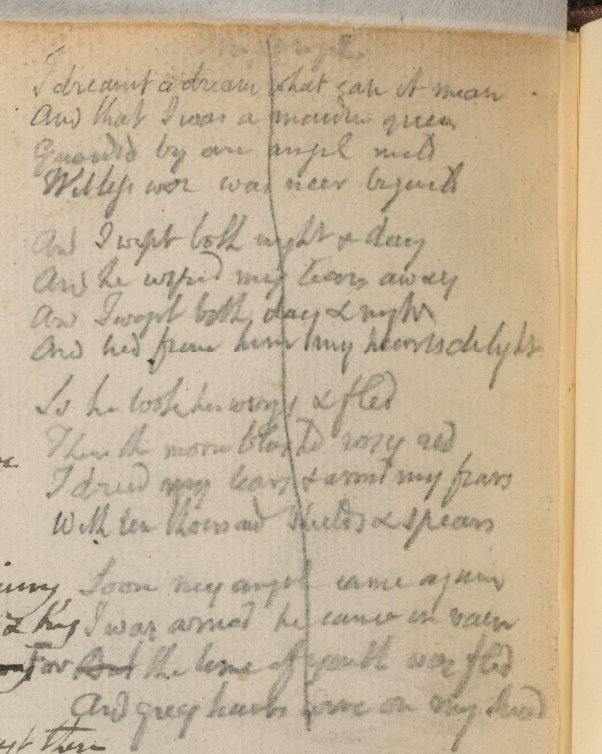
William Blake: Rossetti Manuscript, 1793, No. 52, page p. 103 rev. - The Angel

"The Angel" is a poem written by the English poet William Blake. It was published as part of his collection Songs of Experience in 1794.

Blake republished Songs of Innocence and Songs of Experience several times, often changing the number and order of the plates. In Songs of Experience (With Illuminated Manuscript) published by Musaicum Books, "The Angel" is Plate 13. A two-page manuscript The Order in which the Songs of Innocence & of Experience Ought to be Paged & Placed thought to be composed by Blake in 1821 depicts "The Angel" as Plate 43 in only Copy V of Songs of Innocence and Songs of Experience. It is speculated Blake wrote this manuscript as a guide for arranging the plates of the Songs, using that sequence only in one copy, rejecting the arrangement in all later copies, and then using it as a check-sheet to record available impressions of his plates for Songs of Innocence and Songs of Experience.

== Poem ==
I Dreamt a Dream! what can it mean?
And that I was a maiden Queen:
Guarded by an Angel mild:
Witless woe, was ne'er beguil'd!

And I wept both night and day
And he wip'd my tears away
And I wept both day and night
And hid from him my hearts delight

So he took his wings and fled:
Then the morn blush'd rosy red:
I dried my tears & armed my fears,
With ten thousand shields and spears.

Soon my Angel came again;
I was arm'd, he came in vain:
For the time of youth was fled,
And grey hairs were on my head.

== Context ==
"The Angel" was published by William Blake in the second part of his two-part volume, "Songs of Innocence" in 1789 and "Songs of Experience" in 1794. Later they were republished as a single volume, "Songs of Innocence and Experience" The volume presents themes of the loss of innocence, the corruption of the human condition, and disillusionment of childhood. This concept is strongly embodied in "The Angel".

Blake had a distinct fascination with angels from a young age, as when he was around nine years old and walking through the countryside, he had a vision of a tree filled with angels.

== Theme and interpretation ==
The poem is interpreted in various methods in relation to the symbolism of the angel as it relates to Christianity, and to the poem itself.

Joseph Wicksteed interprets the poem as the angel initially representing a comforting presence that nourishes sadness. The speaker clings to this comfort, hiding her deeper desires behind the vale of tears. However, when the angel leaves due to the lack of genuine reciprocation, she is left feeling betrayed. Wicksteed defines this shift from sorrow to bitterness as a missed opportunity for authentic love, where both sadness and anger replace the deeper, emotional truth, and a moment where the two share a real connection is lost.

S. Foster Damon particularly focuses on the angel's symbolic role as a messenger from Eternity, or from the inner self. He states that angels in Blake's work are often connected to ones that are guiding virtue or inner force. This perspective makes the angel represent the speaker's better self or an inner calling she initially resists. When she eventually embraces the hardened identity and armor against emotion, the angel returns but finds the figure to be changed and emotionally closed. This someone is no longer able to receive the spiritual message or guidance it brings.

== Uses ==
This is one of Blake's poems quoted by the character Mina in David Almond's Skellig.

- Page 38 of David Almond's Skellig in the Dell Yearling (2009) edition alludes to "The Angel"
- Chapter 34, Page 131 of David Almond's Skellig in the Dell Yearling (2009) edition alludes to "The Angel"
- Chapter 34, Page 133 of David Almond's Skellig in the Dell Yearling (2009) edition quotes lines 3 and 4 of "The Angel"
- Chapter 34, Page 134 of David Almond's Skellig in the Dell Yearling (2009) edition quotes lines 13 and 14 of "The Angel"

== Gallery ==
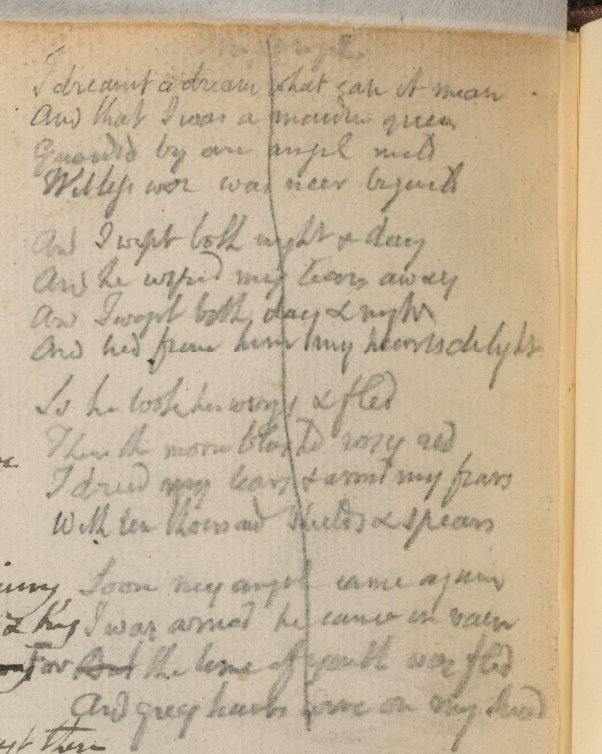
Blake manuscript - Notebook 52 - The Angel

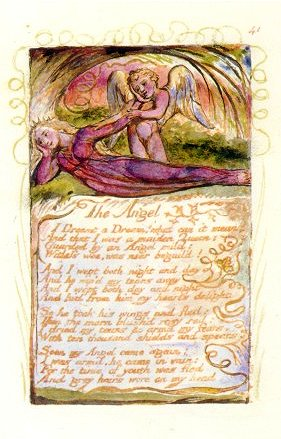
The Angel, Copy W, c. 1825, King's College, Cambridge, England

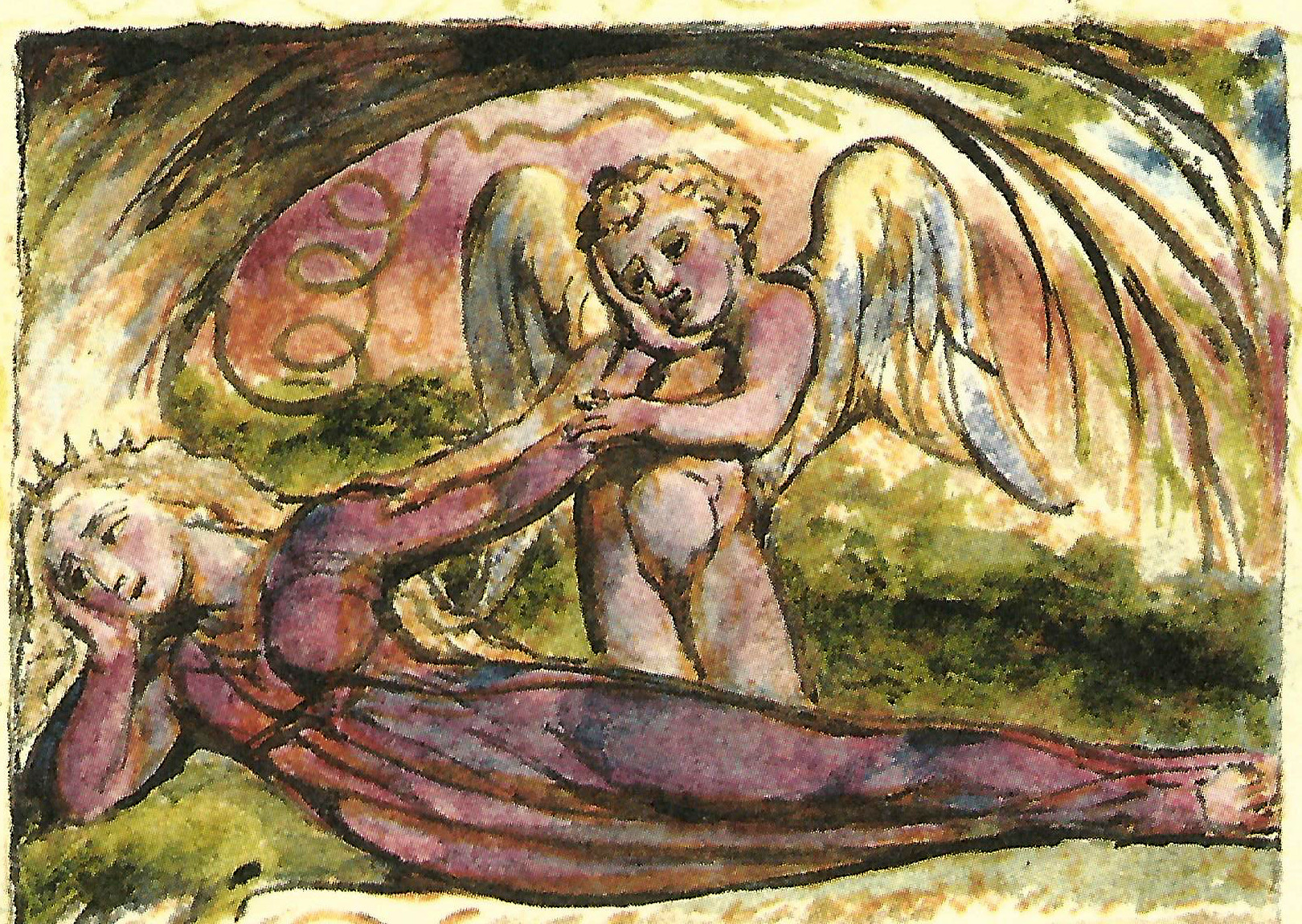
The Angel, Copy W, c. 1825, detail

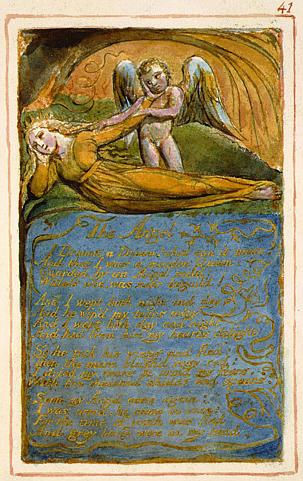
Songs of Innocence and of Experience, copy AA, 1826 (The Fitzwilliam Museum) object 41 The Angel

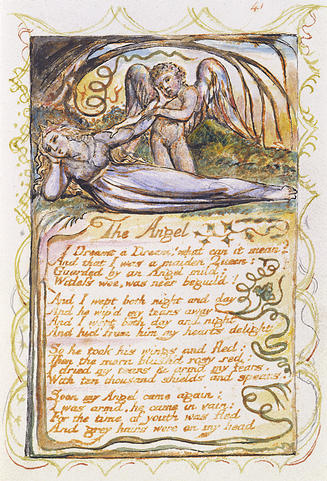
Songs of Innocence and of Experience, copy Y, 1825 (Metropolitan Museum of Art) object 41 The Angel
