= Nurse's Song =

Pair of poems by William Blake

"Nurse's Song" is the name of two related poems by William Blake, published in Songs of Innocence in 1789 and Songs of Experience in 1794.

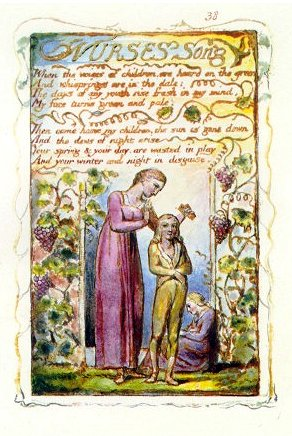
"Nurse's Song"

The poem in Songs of Innocence tells the tale of a nurse who, we are to assume, is looking over some children playing in a field. When she tries to call them in, they protest, claiming that it is still light and therefore there is still time to play. The poem fits in with the theme of innocence, as it makes no mention of the negative aspects of playing outside; the children are oblivious of the dangers of playing outside late at night that would be considered in a modern society. The language uses various images associated with children's playing and imagination. The nurse is of a jovial and warm-hearted nature, as she allows the children to continue with their games, with no thought for the wider consequences. In his commentary, Sir Geoffrey Keynes wrote that one critic said that "few besides Blake could have written such a successful poem on the delight of being allowed to play a little longer until dusk".

The poem in Songs of Experience portrays the nurse in a different light: she is bitter, and fears the consequences of her actions. For critical interpretations of the poems, see here.

== Poem ==
"Nurse's Song" (from Songs of Innocence)

When the voices of children are heard on the green,
And laughing is heard on the hill,
My heart is at rest within my breast,
And everything else is still.

‘Then come home, my children, the sun is gone down,
And the dews of night arise;
Come, come, leave off play, and let us away
Till the morning appears in the skies.’

‘No, no, let us play, for it is yet day,
And we cannot go to sleep;
Besides, in the sky the little birds fly,
And the hills are all cover’d with sheep.’

‘Well, well, go and play till the light fades away,
And then go home to bed.’
The little ones leapèd and shoutèd and laugh’d
And all the hills echoèd.

"Nurse's Song" (from Songs of Experience)

When the voices of children are heard on the green
And whisp'rings are in the dale,
The days of my youth rise fresh in my mind,
My face turns green and pale.

Then come home, my children, the sun is gone down,
And the dews of night arise;
Your spring & your day are wasted in play,
And your winter and night in disguise.
