= Spring (poem) =

1789 poem by William Blake

"Spring" is a lyric poem written and illustrated by William Blake. It was first published in Songs of Innocence (1789) and later in Songs of Innocence and Experience (1794).

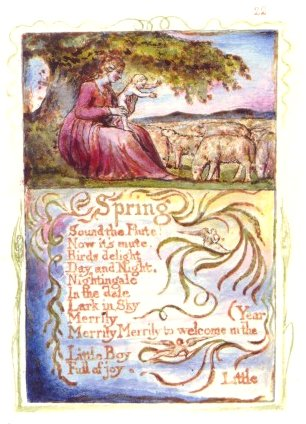
The first plate of "Spring"

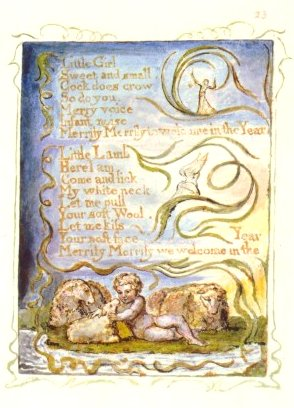
The second plate of "Spring"

== Background ==
William Blake's Songs of Innocence (1789) is a lyric anthology that consists of nineteen illuminated poems. Each poem is accompanied with an illustration by Blake. Songs of Innocence was later combined with Blake's Songs of Experience in 1794 to make Songs of Innocence and Experience, and were printed combined as well as separately.

== Poem ==
Sound the Flute!
Now it's mute.
Birds delight
Day and Night.
Nightingale
In the dale
Lark in Sky
Merrily
Merrily Merrily to welcome in the Year

Little Boy
Full of joy.
Little Girl
Sweet and small,
Cock does crow
So do you.
Merry voice
Infant noise
Merrily Merrily to welcome in the Year

Little Lamb
Here I am,
Come and lick
My white neck.
Let me pull
Your soft Wool.
Let me kiss
Your soft face.
Merrily Merrily we welcome in the Year.

== Style ==
The poem is split into three stanzas. The rhyme scheme goes AABBCCDDE. The last line of each stanza is the same to show the joy the author has for this time of year. The poem is written in dactylic feet. There are several reference's to other poems or characters from Blake's "Songs of Innocence." For example, the introduction of this poem speaks of the flutist, which comes from several of Blake's poems and is illustrated on the front piece for Songs of Innocence. The poem refers The Little Boy, from the poems "The Little Boy lost" and "The Little Boy found". The Little Girl, who appears in several poems in Songs of Experience is mentioned.. The poem also references the Lamb, from the poem "The Lamb". Together Blake incorporates these characters into a happy poem welcoming Springtime, which marks the beginning of a new year for them.

== Interpretation ==
"Spring" is a happily written poem with a hint of rhyme. Devoted to Blake's favorite things, each stanza describing a particular thing. The first stanza is about birds and a bush, the second a little boy and a little girl, and in the final stanza the lamb and "I". This format shows the transition from innocence to a bit of romance, where the child and lamb become close. They share a touch and a kiss in this stanza, and the final line changes from the first two stanzas. With only a single word change, going from "to" to "we", representing the growth of the characters, and how they deviate from the "innocent" title given to them.

In Songs of Innocence several of the poems seem to be linked closely together. Scholars typically associate Spring with "The Echoing Green" due to fourth line in the first stanza "To welcome the Spring,".
