= 1794 in poetry =

Nationality words link to articles with information on the nation's poetry or literature (for instance, Irish or France).

== Events ==
- June – English poets Samuel Taylor Coleridge and Robert Southey first meet, in Oxford while Coleridge is en route for a tour of Wales. In August, they meet again in Bristol (where they also meet local poet Robert Lovell and his sisters-in-law, who they will marry; he also introduces them to the publisher Joseph Cottle). Also beginning this month (following Robespierre's execution in July) they collaborate on the "historic drama" The Fall of Robespierre, published in October and Southey's first published poetry; he also writes the radical play Wat Tyler this summer.
- July 25 – French poet André Chénier is executed at age 31 in Paris two days before the fall of Robespierre. A free spirit who spoke his mind, had pronounced sympathies with the aristocracy but adhered to no particular group, Chenier had attacked the Jacobins in the Journal de Paris, then became quiet and lived outside Paris during the Reign of Terror. He had been arrested and held in the Prison Saint-Lazare before his execution.
- Robert Treat Paine founds the Federal Orrery, a semiweekly Federalist journal in Boston, Massachusetts. It features contributions from Joseph Dennie and Sarah Wentworth Morton, and includes poetry, satire and criticism.

== Works published ==
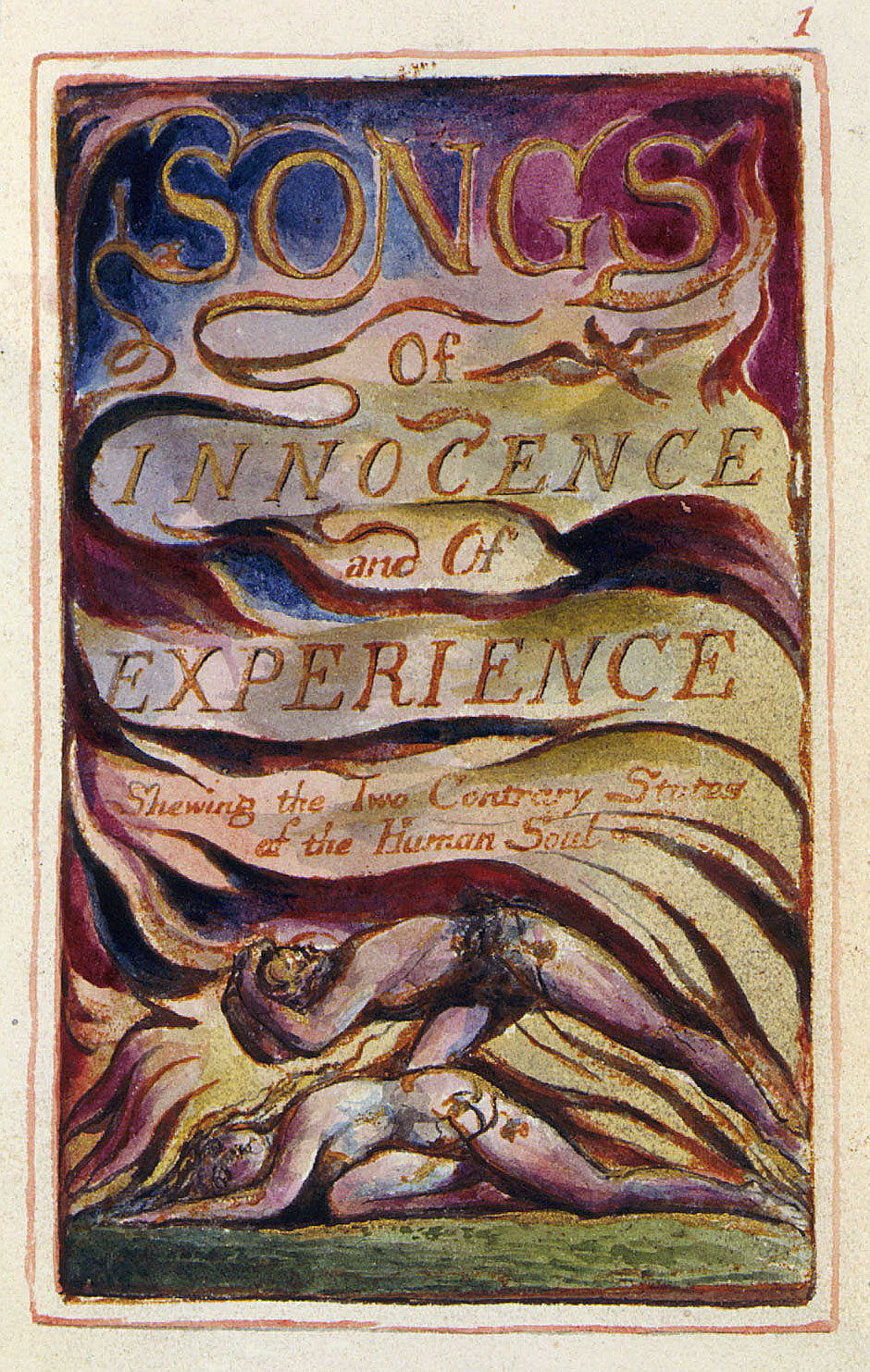
William Blake's frontispiece for Songs of Innocence and of Experience

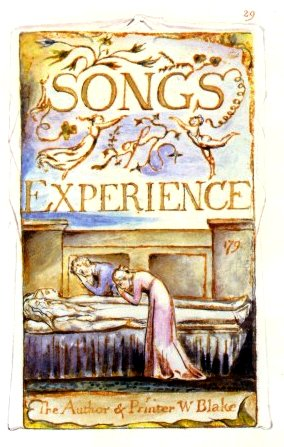
Blake's title plate (No.29) for Songs of Experience

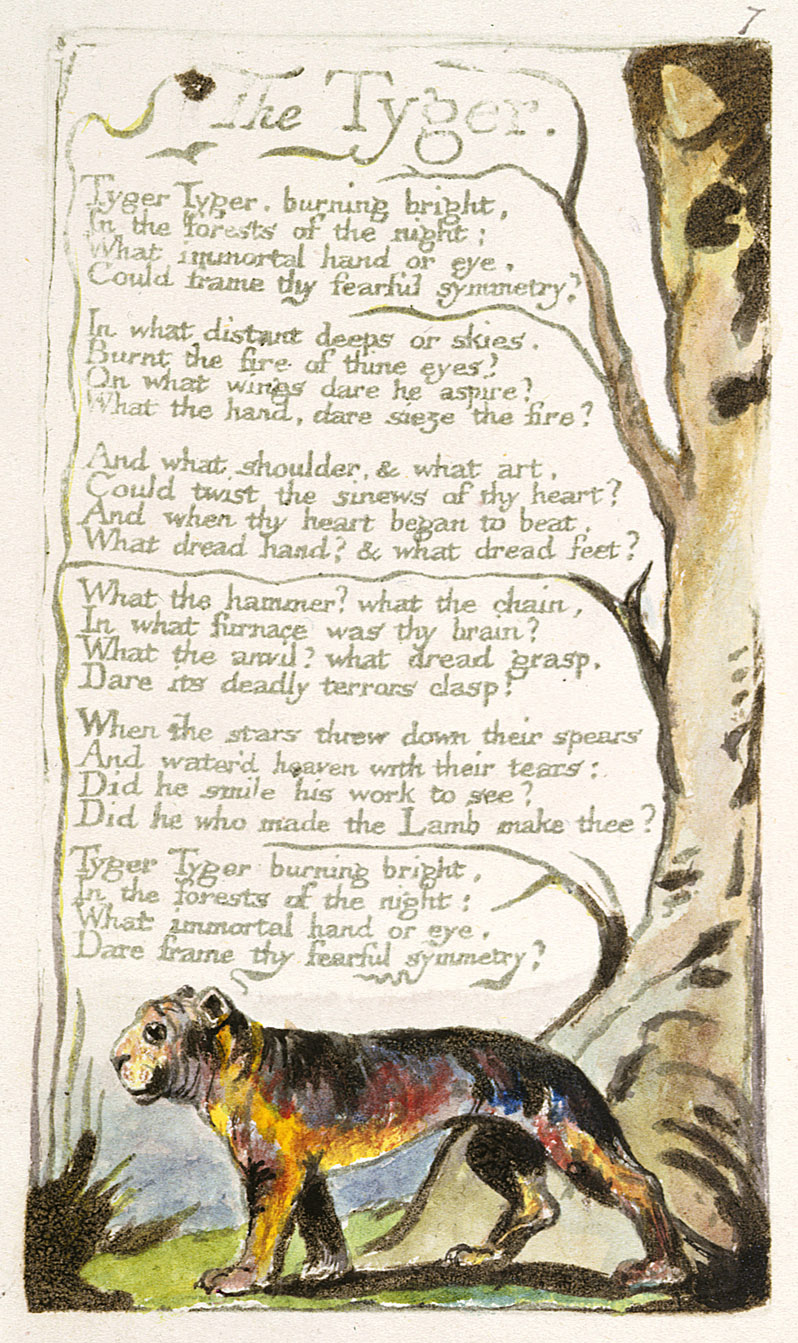
A William Blake original of The Tyger, printed c. 1795

=== United Kingdom ===
- William Blake:
  - Europe, A Prophecy, illuminated book with 17 relief-etched plates; 12 copies known
  - The First Book of Urizen, illuminated book
  - Songs of Innocence and of Experience: Shewing the two contrary states of the human soul; Songs of Innocence first published separately 1789), it is thought that Songs of Experience was always published along with Songs of Innocence; the latter work consists of 28 poems, 14 of them paired with poems of the same title in Songs of Innocence; these poems are in Songs of Experience':
    - Introduction
    - "Earth's Answer"
    - "The Clod and the Pebble"
    - "The Sick Rose"
    - "The Fly"
    - "The Angel"
    - "My Pretty Rose Tree"
    - "Ah! Sun-Flower"
    - "The Lilly"
    - "The Garden of Love"
    - "The Little Vagabond"
    - "London"
    - "A Poison Tree"
    - "A Little Girl Lost"
    - "To Tirzah"
    - "The School Boy"
    - "The Voice of the Ancient Bard"
    - "Nurse's Song" (paired)
    - "Infant Joy" (paired)
    - "The Lamb" (paired)
    - "Holy Thursday" (paired)
    - "Holy Thursday" (paired)
    - "The Chimney Sweeper" (paired)
    - "The Little Boy Lost" (paired)
    - "The Little Boy Found" (paired)
    - "The Divine Image" (paired)
    - "The Little Girl Lost" (paired)
    - "The Little Girl Found" (paired)
    - "The Tyger" (paired)
    - "The Human Abstract" (paired)
    - "Infant Sorrow" (paired)
- Samuel Taylor Coleridge:
  - To a Young Ass, published in the Morning Chronicle, December 9
  - Sonnets on Eminent Characters, also known as Sonnets on Eminent Contemporaries, a series of 11 sonnets published in the Morning Chronicle from December 1 of this year to January 29, 1795; these eight were published this year:
    - To the Hon Mr Erskine (Thomas Erskine); published December 1
    - To Burke (Edmund Burke); December 9
    - To Priestley (Joseph Priestley; published December 11
    - To Fayette (Marquis de Lafayette); December 15
    - To Kosciusko (Tadeusz Kościuszko); December 16
    - To Pitt (William Pitt the Younger); December 23
    - To Bowles (William Lisle Bowles); December 26
    - To Mrs Siddons (Sarah Siddons); December 29
- Erasmus Darwin, The Golden Age
- Thomas Gisborne, Walks in a Forrest
- Richard Payne Knight, The Landscape
- Joseph Ritson, Scottish Song, anthology
- Robert Southey and Robert Lovell, Poems by Bion and Moschus
- Edward Williams, Poems, Lyric and Pastoral

=== United States ===
- William Bradford, A Descriptive and Historical Account of new England in Verse, posthumous, written 1650
- Timothy Dwight, Greenfield Hill: A Poem in Seven Parts, an imitation of John Denham's Cooper's Hill; contrasts wholesome American village life to depraved Europe, and mentions historical events; written after Dwight became a minister in Greenfield, Connecticut; United States
- Philip Freneau, The Village Merchant
- Francis Hopkinson, Ode from Ossian's Poems

=== Other ===
- Thomas Russell, "The Negro's Complaint", anti-slavery poem, published November 5; Ireland

== Births ==
Death years link to the corresponding "[year] in poetry" article:

- September 9 – John Hamilton Reynolds (died 1852), English poet, satirist, critic and playwright
- October 22 – Carlos Wilcox (died 1827), American poet
- November 3 – William Cullen Bryant (died 1878), American romantic poet, journalist and long-time editor of the New York Evening Post
- Approximate date – Maria Gowen Brooks (died c. 1845), American poet

== Deaths ==
Birth years link to the corresponding "[year] in poetry" article:

- January 8 – Justus Möser (born 1720), German jurist and social theorist
- March 26 – Eleonore von Grothaus (born 1734), German poet
- April 5 – Susanna Blamire (born 1747), English poet and writer of Scottish (Lallans) songs
- June 8 – Gottfried August Bürger (born 1748), German poet
- July 25 – André Chénier (born 1762), French poet, executed
- November 22 – Alison Cockburn, née Rutherford (born 1713), Scottish writer and literary hostess

== See also ==
- Poetry
