= To Pitt =

Political poem written by Samuel Taylor Coleridge

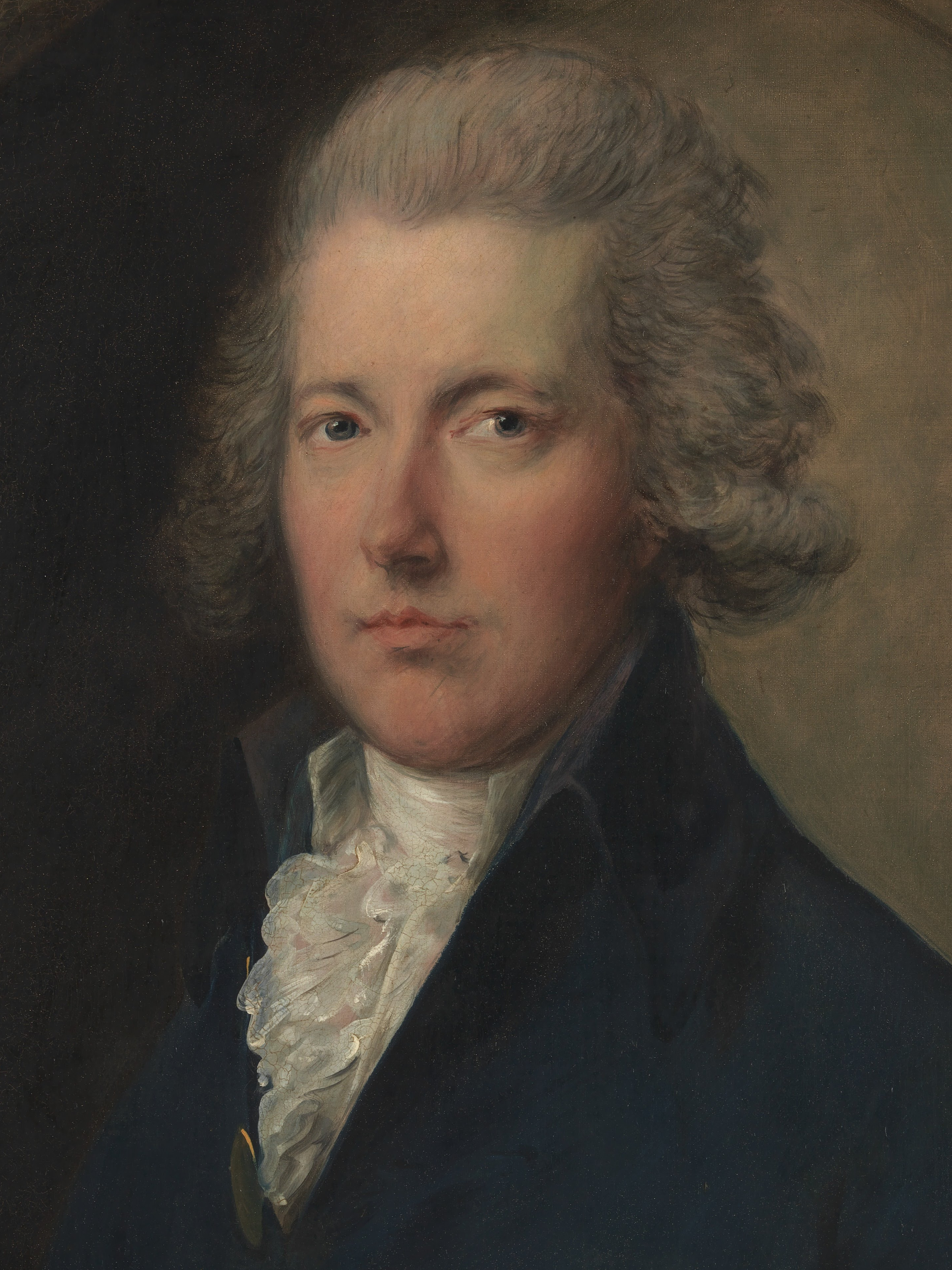
William Pitt the Younger by Thomas Gainsborough

"To Pitt" is a political poem written by Samuel Taylor Coleridge and published in the 26 December 1794 Morning Chronicle as part of the Sonnets on Eminent Characters series. Describing William Pitt the Younger and his role as Prime Minister of Great Britain, the poem is one of the few in the series that is not about a hero of Coleridge. Instead, Pitt is described as Judas, the betrayer of Christ, because of, among other issues, his treatment of political dissidents.

== Background ==
During the end of 1794, Coleridge began work on the series Sonnets on Eminent Characters which he dedicated to people he respected. The first, "To Erskine", was printed on 1 December in the Morning Chronicle, and was followed by 10 further sonnets. "To Pitt", printed on 23 December, was the sixth in the series and was Coleridge's attempt to write a poem contrary in nature to the earlier poems. It was reprinted with a small revision in his magazine The Watchman on 2 April 1796 and included in Coleridge's 1796 collection of poems, under the name "Effusion 3, to Mercy". This edition was soon reprinted in The Universal Magazine for the October 1796 edition.

In May 1794, Pitt suspended Habeas Corpus in response to allegations that both the London Constitutional Society and the London Corresponding Society were plotting against the government. This crack down on opposition to his Prime Ministry was followed by the 1794 Treason Trials, which charged political dissidents with treason. Coleridge witnessed the trials and was affected to the point that he wrote "To Erskine", the first of the Sonnets on Eminent Characters, about Thomas Erskine's defense of the accused. Although Coleridge was an opponent of Pitt's at the time of writing the sonnet "To Pitt", he was to later change his mind about politics and Pitt's government. Coleridge changed his mind about the content of "To Pitt", but still included the poem in his 1803 edition of works under the probable advisement by his friend Charles Lamb. Later, he revised the poem again for an 1828 collection and it kept that form in the two collections that followed in 1829 and 1834.

== Poem ==
The 1796 collected version of the poem reads:

Not always should the tear's ambrosial dew
Roll its soft anguish down thy furrow'd cheek!
Not always haven-breath'd tones of suppliance meek
Beseem thee, MERCY! Yon dark Scowler view,
Who with proud words of dear-lov'd Freedom came—
More blasting, than the mildew from the South!
And kiss'd his country with Iscariot mouth
(Ah! foul apostate from his Father's fame!)
Then fix'd her on the cross of deep distress,
And at safe distance marks the thirsty lance
Pierce her big side! But o! if some strange trance
The eye-lids of thy stern-brow'd Sister press,
Seize, MERCY! thou more terrible the brand,
And hurl her thunderbolts with fiercer hand!

In the original edition, the 8th line to the 13th read:

(Staining most foul a godlike Father's name)!
Then fix'd her on the cross of deep distress,
And at safe distance marks the thirsty lance
Pierce her big side! But o! if some strange trance
The eye-lids of thy stern-brow'd Sister press,
Seize thou, more terrible, th' avenging brand—

— lines 8-13

To this, a footnote to the 8th line read explaining that the reference was to the Earl of Chatham and a footnote to the 12th line explaining that the reference was to Justice.

== Themes ==
"To Pitt" is one of the few poems in the Sonnets on Eminent Characters series that does not address one of the writer's heroes. It deals with actions of the Prime Minister that resulted in the suspension of Habeas Corpus, as well as the government's response to those opposed to Pitt's actions. As Rosemary Ashton, the 20th-century Coleridge biographer, points out that, "Coleridge undoubtedly courted prosecution of this attack, not least because of the emotive allusion to Britain as Christ betrayed by Judas-Pitt." Fellow biographer Richard Holmes described the poem as Coleridge having "daringly attacked" Pitt.

However, the political ramifications and effect of the poem were ephemeral. In a 1901 account, H D Traill claimed that Coleridge's sonnets did not fully achieve the effect the poet sought. Even though the thought behind the sonnet is "neatly wrapped up in its envelope of words [...] as in the sonnet to Pitt" it "is too frequently only another word for an ephemeral violence of political feeling which, whether displayed on one side or the other, cannot be expected to reproduce its effect in the minds of comparatively passionless posterity."

The poem is related to the earlier "To Burke", from the same series. In that poem, Coleridge looked at Burke's rhetorical abuse of the concept of "freedom". This idea is examined again and, as with the earlier poem, the abusive figure is seen as a male dominating a female image. Pitt, as Judas, kisses a female version of Christ while simultaneously seeking to seduce that female character, which represents Britain. Other female characters, justice and mercy, are said to destroy Pitt, but it is uncertain within the poem as how they attain this destruction. The use of symbolic female characters is relied on in many of Coleridge's poems for positive and negative images.
