= To Burke =

Sonnet by Samuel Taylor Coleridge

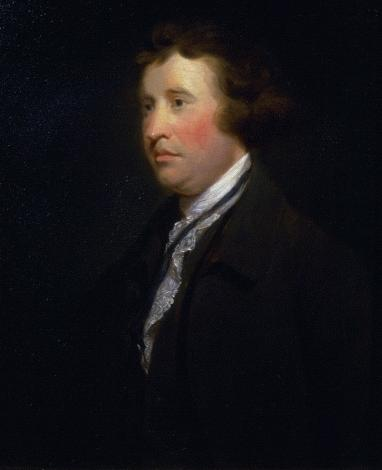
Edmund Burke

"To Burke" is a sonnet by Samuel Taylor Coleridge first published in the 9 December 1794 Morning Chronicle. Unlike most of the Sonnets on Eminent Characters, "To Burke" describes a person whom Coleridge disagreed with; he felt Edmund Burke abused the idea of freedom within various speeches and turned his back on liberty.

== Background ==
After Coleridge's sonnet "To Erksine" appeared in the 1 December 1794 Morning Chronicle, Coleridge submitted another sonnet "To Burke" and gave it the title "Sonnets on Eminent Characters NO II". The poem was first published in the 9 December 1794 Morning Chronicle and was included in Coleridge's 1796 collection of poems with a note that criticized Burke for taking a government pension. The poem was later included in Coleridge's later collections of poems, but lacked the note added in the 1796 collection. The note, to line 9 in the 1796 version, read:

When I composed this line, I had not read the following paragraph in the Cambridge Intelligencer (of Saturday, November 21, 1795.) When Mr. Burke first crossed over the House of Commons from the Opposition to the Ministry, he received a pension of 1200£ a-year charged on the King's Privy Purse! When he had completed his labors, it was then a question of supply of money, it was thought that a pension of 1200£ per annum for forty years certain, would sell for eighteen years purchase, and bring him of course 36,000£. But this pension must, by the very unfortunate act, of which Mr. Burke was himself the author, have come before Parliament. Instead of this Mr. Pitt suggested the idea of a pension of 2000£ a-year for three lives, to be charged on the King's Revenue of the West India 4 1/8 per cents [...] We feel not for the Public in the present instance: we feel for the honor of genius; and mourn to find one of her most richly-gifted children associated with the Youngs, Wynhams, and Reeveses of the day [...] It is consoling to the lovers of human nature, to reflect that Edmund Burke, the only writer of that fact 'whose name would not sully the page of an opponent,' learnt the discipline of genius in a different corps. Peace be to his spirit, when it departs from us: this is the severest punishment I wish him—that he may be appointed under-porter to St. Peter, and be obliged to open the gate of Heaven to Brissot, Roland, Concordet, Fayette, and Priestley!

Coleridge, in his childhood, memorized Burke's speeches and Burke was an individual that was mentioned by Coleridge throughout his life. Although Burke approved of the American Revolution, he did not support the French Revolution which placed Burke as having a view opposite to Coleridge when Coleridge wrote "To Burke". Coleridge was to later claim that he was never a Jacobin or held Jacobin beliefs in Biographia Literaria. However, "To Burke" was written in response to Burke's anti-Jacobin views. Coleridge may be correct that he was not a Jacobin, as he still respected Burke as a genius but felt that Burke was mistaken when it came to the French Revolution

== Poem ==
As late I lay in Slumber's shadowy vale,
With wetted cheek and in a mourner's guise,
I saw the sainted form of Freedom rise:
She spake! not sadder moans the autumnal gale—

"Great Son of Genius! sweet to me thy name,
Ere in an evil hour with alter'd voice
Thou bad'st Oppression's hireling crew rejoice
Blasting with wizard spell my laurell'd fame.

Yet never, Burke! thou drank'st Corruption's bowl!
Thee stormy Pity and the cherish'd lure
Of Pomp, and proud Preciptance of soul
Wilder'd with meteor fires. Ah Spirit pure!

That Error's mist had left thy purgéd eye:
So might I clasp thee with a Mother's joy!"

Between the editions, there was only one change and that is in line 12, which read in the 9 December 1794 version: "Urg'd on with wild'rin fires".

== Themes ==
Of all the Sonnets on Eminent Characters, only "To Burke" and "To Pitt" are addressed to people that Coleridge disagreed with. Like "To Erskine", "To Burke" is connected to Milton's poetry with the beginning lines following Milton's "Methought I saw my late espoused for Saint". However, Coleridge's view contradicts Milton's as he describes Burke as getting in the way of freedom.

Coleridge was supportive of the French Revolution, and, when he attacked Burke as supporting oppression, he adopted "Freedom" as his narrator. In the description, Burke is seen as a masculine force that harms the feminine "Freedom". This gender relationship is carried through the poem until the end with "Freedom" asking for Burke to be restored by returning to the role as a son. Freedom, in the poem, must be obeyed as a son obeys a parent. The descriptions of magic describe Burke's fall from innocence and his inability to love his mother figure.

When Coleridge published his third sonnet in the series, "To Priestley", the imagery used is similar with Priestley holding the characteristics that Burke lacked. Coleridge's negative view of Burke continued through his life, and, when Coleridge later criticized Burke for taking a pension in the 1796 note, he is reusing ideas previously expressed in his 1 March 1796 The Watchman review of Burke's Letter to a Noble Lord. The emphasis on Burke's genius was echoed by William Wordsworth, Coleridge's friend, years later in the Prelude Book 7.
