= To Bowles =

Sonnet written by Samuel Taylor Coleridge

"To Bowles" was written by Samuel Taylor Coleridge and published in the 26 December 1794 Morning Chronicle as part of the Sonnets on Eminent Characters series. William Lisle Bowles's poetry was introduced to Coleridge in 1789 and Bowles had an immediate impact on Coleridge's views of poetry. The sonnet celebrates Bowles's status as a poet. It also discusses Bowles's political beliefs, which helped shape Coleridge's ideas on government and politics.

== Background ==
Bowles had an important part in Coleridge's early poetry; he served as a model Coleridge. This influence can be traced to when Coleridge was given a copy of Bowles's Sonnets, Written Chiefly on Picturesque Spots, During a Tour in 1789. Later, Coleridge dedicated a poem to Bowles in order to praise him. The poem "To Bowles" was the seventh of his Sonnets on Eminent Characters series. It was first printed on 26 December 1794 in the Morning Chronicle and rewritten for Coleridge's 1796 collection of poems.

As a footnote, Coleridge explained that Bowles was "Author of Sonnets and other Poems, published by Dilly. To Mr. Bowles's Poetry I have always thought the following remark, from Maximus Tyrius, peculiarly applicable [...] 'I am not now treating of that Poetry, which is estimated by the pleasure it affords to the ear—the ear having been corrupted and the judgment-seat of the perceptions; but of that which proceeds from the intellectual Helicon, that which is dignified, and appertaining to human feelings, and entering into the soul."—The 13th Sonnet [...] the 19th [...] and the 25th [...] are compositions of, perhaps, unrivalled merit. Yet, while I am selecting these, I almost accuse myself of causeless partiality; for surely never was a Writer so equal in excellence!" Coleridge's quoting of Maximus Tyrius leaves out part of Maximus's quote that suggests the sentence is describing music.

== Poem ==
The original version reads:

My heart has thank'd thee, Bowles! for those soft strains,
That, on the still air floating, tremblingly
Wak'd in me Fancy, Love, and Sympathy!
For hence, not callous to a Brother's pains

Thro' Youth's gay prime and thornless paths I went;
And, when the darker day of life began,
And I did roam, a thought-bewilder'd man!
Thy kindred Lays an healing solace lent,

Each lonely pang with dreamy joys combin'd,
And stole from vain Regret her scorpion stings;
While shadowy Pleasure, with mysterious wings,
Brooded the wavy and tumultuous mind,

Like that great Spirit, who with plastic sweep
Mov'd on the darkness of the formless Deep!

— lines 1–14

The 1796 version of the poem reads:

My heart has thank'd thee, Bowles! for those soft strains,
Whose sadness soothes me, like the murmuring
Of wild-bees in the sunny showers of spring!
For hence not callous to the mourner's pains
...
And I did roam, a thought-bewilder'd man,
Their mild and manliest melancholy lent

A mingled charm, such as the pang consign'd,
To slumber, though the big tear it renew'd;
Bidding a strange mysterious Pleasure brood
Over the wavy and tumultuous mind,

As that great Spirit erst with plastic sweep
Mov'd on the darkness of the formless deep.

— lines 1–4, 7–14

== Themes ==
The sonnet praises Bowles's abilities as a poet while comparing him to other poets. This occurred in many of Coleridge's works including a comparison of Bowles with William Cowper in a December 1796 letter to John Thelwall: "But do not let us introduce an act of Uniformity against Poets—I have room enough in my brain to admire, aye & almost equally, the head and fancy of Akenside, and the heart and fancy of Bowles, the solemn Lordliness of Milton, & the divine Chit chat of Cowper." This was followed in Biographia Literaria with a claim that the two poets that were, "the first who combine natural thoughts with natural diction; the first who reconciled the heart with the head".

Most of the Sonnets on Eminent Characters is devoted to those Coleridge considered heroes. Although Coleridge praises Bowles for "soft Strains", Coleridge was to turn to flashy type of poetic model as he developed as a poet. However, the sonnets as a whole were not just about poetry but about Coleridge's political beliefs. Coleridge emphasizes Bowles within the poem in political terms because, as Coleridge claimed, the other poet influenced Coleridge's political beliefs. In particular, Bowles provided Coleridge with the ideas of a universal brotherhood.
