= To Fayette =

Poem written by Samuel Taylor Coleridge

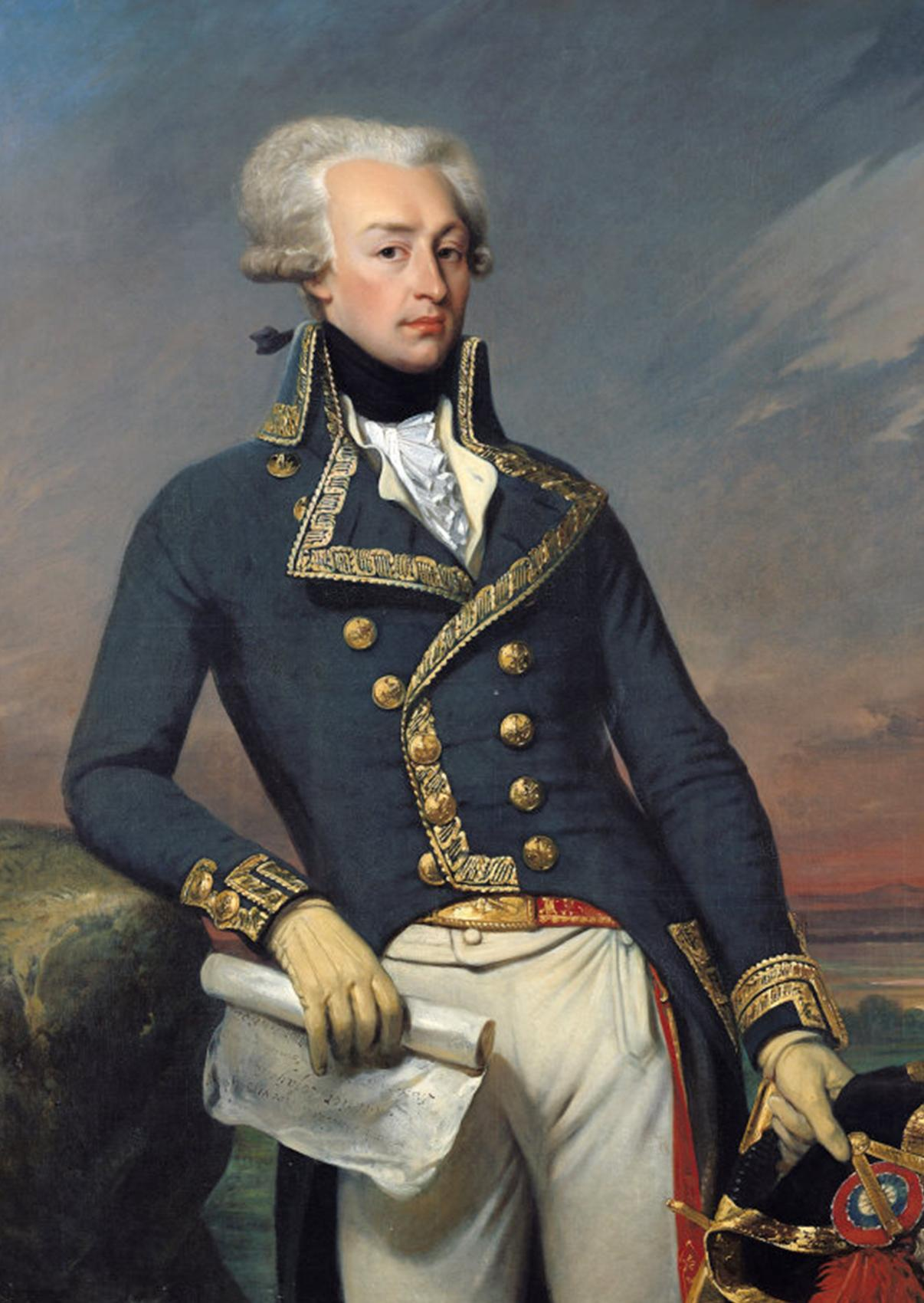
Gilbert du Motier, marquis de Lafayette in 1792; painting by Joseph-Désiré Court

"To Fayette" was written by Samuel Taylor Coleridge and published in the 26 December 1794 Morning Chronicle as part of the Sonnets on Eminent Characters series. Coleridge, like other Romantic poets, viewed Gilbert du Motier, marquis de Lafayette as a hero of liberty for his part in the American and French revolutions. The poem coincides with Fayette's imprisonment in Austria, and he is treated as a martyr for liberty. The language Coleridge uses within the poem to describe Fayette and revolutions appears in many of his later works.

== Background ==
"To Fayette" is the fourth poem of the Sonnets of Eminent Characters series and follows "To Priestley". It was completed at the beginning of December 1794 and published in the 15 December 1794 Morning Chronicle. The poem was included in Coleridge's collections of poetry from 1796 onwards with minimal changes. A footnote was added to line 14 which read, "The above beautiful Sonnet was written antecedently to the joyful account of the Patriot's escape from the Tyrant's Dungeon." In a letter dated 1 November 1796 to Thomas Poole, Coleridge explained that "To Fayette" would be included as "Juvenilia" in the second edition of the 1796 collection with "an advertisement signifying that the Poems were retained by the desire of some friends, but that they are to be considered as being in the Author's own opinion of very inferiour merit."

Lafayette was involved in the American Revolution serving as a major-general and served in France as the commander of the National Guard between 1789 and 1791 after the Bastille fell. He later joined with the reformers during the beginning of the French Revolution, and he eventually became a member of the Estates General. After the French monarch was removed, he was imprisoned in Austria and was not released until 1797. Like many of the Romantic poets, Coleridge saw those who challenged their governments in the name of liberty as a hero, which included Lafayette.

== Poem ==
As when far off the warbled strains are heard
That soar on Morning's wing the vales among;
Within his cage the imprison'd Matin Bird
Swells the full chorus with a generous song:

He bathes no pinion in the dewy light,
No Father's joy, no Lover's bliss he shares,
Yet still the rising radiance cheers his sight—
His fellows' Freedom soothes the Captive's cares!

Thou, Fayette! who didst wake with startling voice
Life's better Sun from that long wintry night,
Thus in thy Country's triumphs shalt rejoice
And mock with raptures high the Dungeon's might:

For lo! the Morning struggles into Day,
And Slavery's spectres shriek and vanish from the ray!

== Themes ==
The conclusion of "To Fayette" describes the image of the "ray", which is connected to two of Coleridge's sonnets on Pantisocracy, his idea for a better society to be created in America. The "ray" is a spiritual light that is connected to a coming regeneration of the world that is connected to his poem Religious Musings that came at the end of the year. In these poems, the idea of revolution is combined with millennialism. The emphasis on Lafayette as a political prisoner that was being martyred for his beliefs would be relied on again in "To Kosciusko", the next poem in the Sonnets on Eminent Characters series. Later, Coleridge planned a lecture for the summer of 1795 that would compare Lafayette with Robert Devereux.

Lafayette, like Joseph Priestley who was placed in contrast to the image of Edmund Burke, was listed among those that would meet Burke in Heaven according to a footnote in "To Burke": "It is consoling to the lovers of human nature, to reflect that Edmund Burke, the only writer of that fact 'whose name would not sully the page of an opponent,' learnt the discipline of genius in a different corps. Peace be to his spirit, when it departs from us: this is the severest punishment I wish him—that he may be appointed under-porter to St. Peter, and be obliged to open the gate of Heaven to Brissot, Roland, Concordet, Fayette, and Priestley!"

== Critical response ==
An anonymous review of Coleridge's 1796 collection of poems in the June 1796 Critical Review selected "To Fayette" as an example of Coleridge's poetry, stating, "The Effusions are in general very beautiful. The following will please every lover of poetry, and we give them as a specimen of the rest".
