= To Kosciusko =

Set of three sonnets

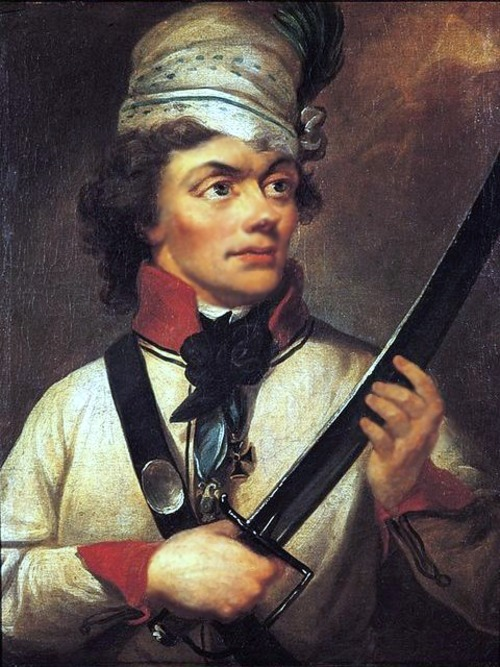
Kościuszko by Kazimierz Wojniakowski

"To Kosciusko" is the name shared by three sonnets written by Samuel Taylor Coleridge, Leigh Hunt, and John Keats. Coleridge's, the original, was written in December 1794 and published in the 16 December 1794 Morning Chronicle as the fifth of his Sonnets on Eminent Characters series. Hunt and Keats were inspired to follow his poem with their own versions (under the same title) in November 1815 and December 1816, respectively. The sonnets were dedicated to heroism of Tadeusz Kościuszko, leader of the 1794 Polish rebellion against Prussian and Russian control.

== Background ==
Towards the end of 1794, Coleridge began writing a series of sonnets called Sonnets on Eminent Characters. The first sonnet, "To Erskine", was printed on 1 December in the Morning Chronicle, and 10 more sonnets followed. Coleridge's sonnet "To Kosciusko" was the fifth in the series, printed on 16 December. The poem was revised twice, first for a 1796 collection and then for an 1828 collection of Coleridge's poems. It remained in that final form for the two collections that followed, in 1829 and 1834.

Kosciusko was a Polish national who led Poland in rebellion against two countries, Prussia and Russia, during the spring of 1794. When the rebellion was crushed by that October, he was captured by Russian forces and held as a prisoner. Coleridge knew few details about the specifics, and altered his poem when he found out that Kosciusko was merely wounded and captured instead of being killed.

The British Romantic poets favoring of Kosciusko as a hero can be traced to Coleridge, and Leigh Hunt published his own sonnet on Kosciusko in the 19 November 1815 Examiner. Following this, Keats wrote his version of the sonnet in December 1816 and published it in the 16 February 1817 examiner.

== Poem ==
The 1796 edition of the poem reads:

O what a loud and fearful shriek was there,
As tho' a thousand souls one death-groan pour'd!
Ah me! they view'd beneath an hireling's sword
Fall'n KOSCIUSKO! Thro' the burthen'd air
(As pauses the tir'd Cossac's barb'rous yell
Of Triumph) on the chill and midnight gale
Rises with frantic burst or sadder swell
The dirge of murder'd Hope! while Freedom pale
Bends in such anguish o'er her destin'd bier,
As if from eldest time some Spirit meek
Had gather'd in a mystic urn each tear
That ever furrow'd a sad Patriot's cheek;
And she had drain'd the sorrows of the bowl
Ev'n till she reel'd, intoxicate of soul!

Coleridge's uncertainty of Kosciusko's state after the defeat of the Polish rebellion is shown in the original 3rd and 4th line:

Great KOSCIUSKO, 'neath an Hireling's sword,
His Country view'd.—Hark! thro' the list'ning air,

— lines 3–4

For the 1828 edition and later printings of the poem, the final lines read:

That ever on a Patriot's furrowed cheek
Fit channel found; and she had drained the bowl
In the mere wilfulness, and sick despair of soul!

— lines 12–14

=== Hunt ===
Hunt, like Coleridge, saw Kosciusko as a hero, admiring his character during the Polish rebellion and, as the subtitle suggests, his having "never fought either for Buonaparte or the allies". Hunt's version reads:

'Tis like thy patient valour thus to keep,
Great Kosciusko, to the rural shade,
While Freedom's ill-found amulet still is made
Pretence for old aggression, and a heap
Of selfish mockeries. There, as in the sweep
Of stormier fields, thou earnest with thy blade,
Transform'd, not inly alter'd, to the spade,
Thy never yielding right to a calm sleep.
There came a wanderer, borne from land to land
Upon a couch, pale, many-wounded, mild,
His brow with patient pain dulcetly sour.
Men stoop'd with awful sweetness on his hand,
And kiss'd it; and collected Virtue smiled,
To think how sovereign her enduring hour.

=== Keats ===
Following Coleridge's poem, Keats wrote his own sonnet called "To Kosciusko". Keats's version reads:

Good Kosciusko, thy great name alone
Is a full harvest whence to reap high feeling:
It comes upon us like the glorious pealing
Of the wide spheres-an everlasting tone.
And now it tells me, that in the worlds unknown,
The names of heroes, burst from clouds concealing,
And changed to harmonies, for ever stealing
Through cloudless blue, and round each silver throne.
It tells me too, that on a happy day,
When some good spirit walks upon the earth,
Thy name with Alfred's, and the great of yore
Gently commingling, gives tremendous birth
To a loud hymn, that sounds far, far away
To where the great God lives for evermore.

== Themes ==
Kosciusko was a hero to Coleridge as a patriot, even though Kosciusko was Polish and many of Coleridge's political heroes were British. Hunt and Keats viewed Kosciusko as a political ideal that was connected to King Alfred, a figure who was believed to have established English constitutional liberty.

The praise within the poem is similar to how Coleridge praised Fayette; he believed that both were political prisoners who were martyred for their beliefs. Coleridge discussed Kosciusko and the issues surrounding Poland in many of his works, including during a lecture series that Coleridge gave in 1795 and articles within Coleridge's newspaper, Watchman.

The first four lines of Coleridge's poem are related in style to Thomas Campbell's The Pleasures of Hope, with the line "And Freedom shriek'd when Koskiusko fell" in particular. However, Campbell did not come up with the phrasing on his own. Instead, he based his phrasing on an ode by John Dennis with a line that reads, "Fair Liberty shriek'd out aloud, aloud Religion groan'd".
