= To Priestley =

Sonnet by Samuel Taylor Coleridge

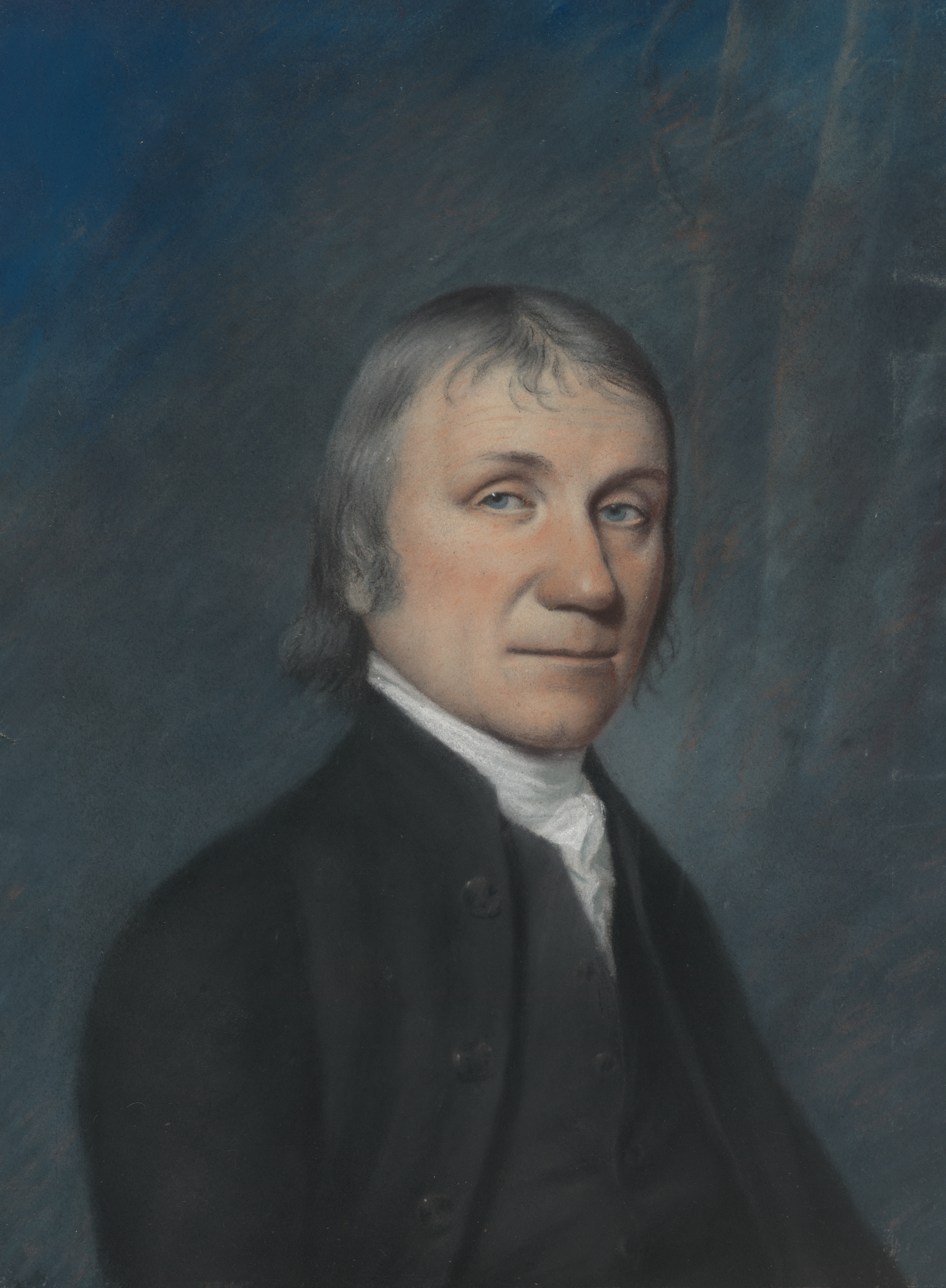
Joseph Priestley

"To Priestley" is a sonnet by Samuel Taylor Coleridge first published in the 11 December 1794 Morning Chronicle. Like most of the Sonnets on Eminent Characters, "To Priestley" addresses an individual Coleridge particularly admired; Joseph Priestley held many political and theological beliefs that Coleridge adopted during this time.

== Background ==
Coleridge completed "To Priestley" at the beginning of December 1794. Following "To Burke", "To Priestley was published in the 11 December 1794 Morning Chronicle as the third poem in the Sonnets on Eminent Characters series. The poem was later included in Coleridge's 1796 collection of poems and collections printed after with few changes.

After a mob burned Priestley's Birmingham house during the summer of 1791, he left England for America. The mob that drove Priestley away were motivated by Priestley's support of the French Revolution. Coleridge's own views were similar to Priestley's and even Priestley's ideas expressed in Experiments and Observations on Different Kinds of Air and Disquisitions relating to Matter and Spirit were discussed in part in Coleridge's poetry.

Coleridge was also corresponding with Priestley at the time, to discuss Coleridge and Robert Southey's idea of Pantisocracy. During this time, Priestley's sons were working with Thomas Cooper to find an appropriate location for Coleridge to start up his community. In general, Coleridge viewed Priestley as both a spiritual and intellectual leader, and Coleridge's political life was to spread Priestley's views after Priestley left for America. However, Coleridge was to abandon Priestley's ideas about Unitarianism and religion a decade later as he turned to Anglicanism.

== Poem ==
Though rous'd by that dark Vizir Riot rude
Have driven our Priestly o'er the Ocean swell;
Though Superstition and her wolfish brood
Bay his mild radiance, impotent and fell;

Calm in his halls of brightness he shall dwell!
For lo! Religion at his strong behest
Starts with mild anger from the Papal spell,
And flings to Earth her tinsel-glittering vest,

Her mitred State and cumbrous Pomp unholy;
And Justice wakes to bid th' Oppressor wail
Insulting aye the wrongs of patient Folly;
And from her dark retreat by Wisdom won

Meek Nature slowly lifts her matron veil
To smile with fondness on her gazing Son!

The original first line read "Tho' King-bred rage, with lawless uproar rude", the original seventh line read "Disdainful rouses from the Papal spell", and the original eleventh line read "That ground th' ensnared soul of patient Folly".

== Themes ==
Like many of the Sonnets on Eminent Characters, "To Priestley" was dedicated to an individual that Coleridge viewed as one of his heroes. The imagery within the poem corresponds to the ideas in "To Burke" with an emphasis on Priestley being a defender of freedom and without flaws. The original line 1 of the poem described the royalty's role in the events leading up to the destruction of Priestley's home. The revised version describes John Reeves as the "dark Vizir" or, in the 1796 edition, describes Pitt.

Coleridge's views on Priestley appear in many of his works, including Religious Musings written at the end of 1794. John Bowring, in an 1830 review for the Westminster Review, emphasized how the poem served to represent a transitional stage in Coleridge's poetic career: "Happily he soon ascended into a purer region of fancy; and that not without leaving the print of his steps in the clay from which he sprung. The personifications in his Sonnet on the expatriation of Dr. Priestley, are as good as such things can be. The concluding reference to Priestley's philosophical discoveries, might suggest a noble group for the sculptor."
