= To Erskine =

Poem by Samuel Taylor Coleridge, 1794

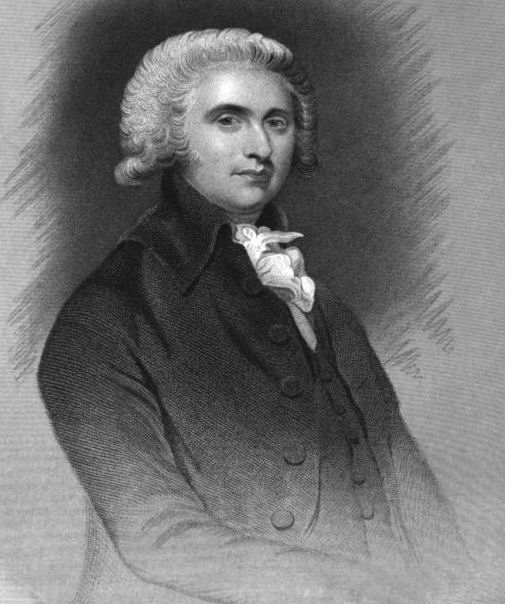
Thomas Erskine

"To Erskine" or "To the Hon Mr Erskine" was written by Samuel Taylor Coleridge in November 1794. The subject of the poem is Thomas Erskine, a lawyer and member of the Whig party, who successfully served in the defense of three political radicals during the 1794 Treason Trials. Coleridge admired Erskine's defense and praised his refusal to accept money for his service. The poem was published in the 1 December 1794 Morning Chronicle as part of the Sonnets on Eminent Characters series. It was later included in various collections of Coleridge's poetry published later.

== Background ==
"To Erskine" was first published in the 1 December 1794 Morning Chronicle. The sonnet was prefaced with a note addressed to the editor reading: "If, Sir, the following Poems will not disgrace your poetical department, I will transmit you a series of Sonnets (as it is the fashion to call them), addressed, like these, to eminent Contemporaries." Following the poem was a note by the editor that read, "Our elegant Correspondent will highly gratify every reader of taste by the continuance of his exquisitely beautiful productions. No. II. shall appear on an early day." Coleridge did not particularly like "To Erskine", but did rework the poem for his 1796 collection of poems and the poem was included in the 1803 edition and three others that followed.

Erskine, a member of the Whig party, was a lawyer that served as a defender during the 1794 Treason Trials, a series of trials in which those of liberal/radical political beliefs were charged with treason for their published views. As a defender for those tried, notably Thomas Hardy, John Thelwall, and John Horne Tooke, he gave speeches that Coleridge admired. The trials were viewed by newspapers as a spectacle that attracted a lot of public attention. Those who were paid to serve for either side were ridiculed and mocked as if they were performers. Even the Morning Chronicle put forth a story that described an individual being paid to join a particular side: a group of people were paid to burn an effigy of one side and then paid to burn an effigy of the other side. Erskine, unlike others, did not accept money to defend those put on trial for treason. His reason for waiving his attorney fee was: "The situation of the unfortunate prisoners entitles them to every degree of tenderness and attention, and their inability to render me any professional compensation, does not remove them at a greater distance from one."

== Poem ==
When British Freedom for a happier land
Spread her broad wings, that flutter'd with affright,
Erskine! thy voice she heard, and paus'd her flight
Sublime of hope, for dreadless thou didst stand

(Thy censer glowing with the hallow'd flame)
An hireless Priest before the insulted shrine,
And at her altar pourd'st the stream divine
Of unmatch'd eloquence. There thy name

Her sons shall venerate, and cheer thy breast
With blessings heaven-ward breath'd. And when the doom
Of Nature bids thee die, beyond the tomb
Thy light shall shine: as sunk beneath the West

Though the great Summer Sun eludes our gaze,
Still burns wide Heaven with his distended blaze.

== Themes ==
Like many of the Sonnets on Eminent Characters, "To Erskine" is addressed to one of Coleridge's heroes. Erskine attained that position through defending the idea of "British Freedom" during the trials of Hardy, Thelwall, and Tooke for treason. The poem was written after Erskine was triumphant in his defense of those individuals which allowed them to continue on promoting their politically liberal ideas. Coleridge's line about Erskine being a "hireless priest" refers to the trial directly and how Erskine fought for the defense pro bono. This emphasis on Erskine being free from a monetary taint is similar to the praise of Erskine published in 1823 following his death.

Within the poem, Coleridge returns to the Miltonic use of sonnet as a polemical tool. In particular, "To Erskine" would be connected to Milton's 16th sonnet to Cromwell or to his 17th dedicated to Henry Vane. Besides being one of the Sonnets on Eminent Characters, Coleridge would later connect to the poem within his own works. In particular, he evokes his praise for Erskine in the sonnet within the final issue of his political newspaper The Watchman. Within the work, Coleridge describes Thelwall as successor to Erskine.
