= The Little Girl Lost =

Poem by William Blake

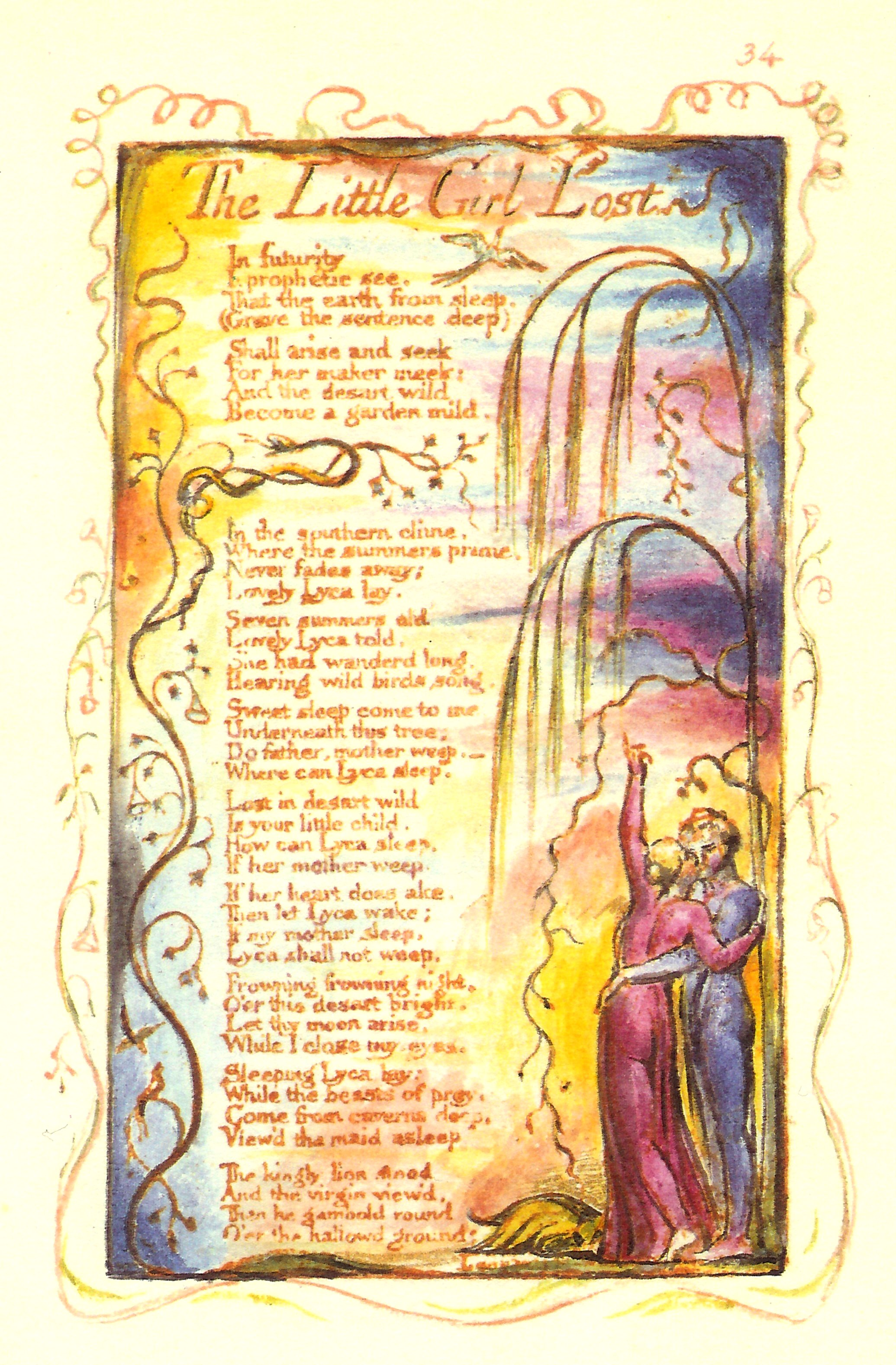
William Blake's original plate for The Little Girl Lost.

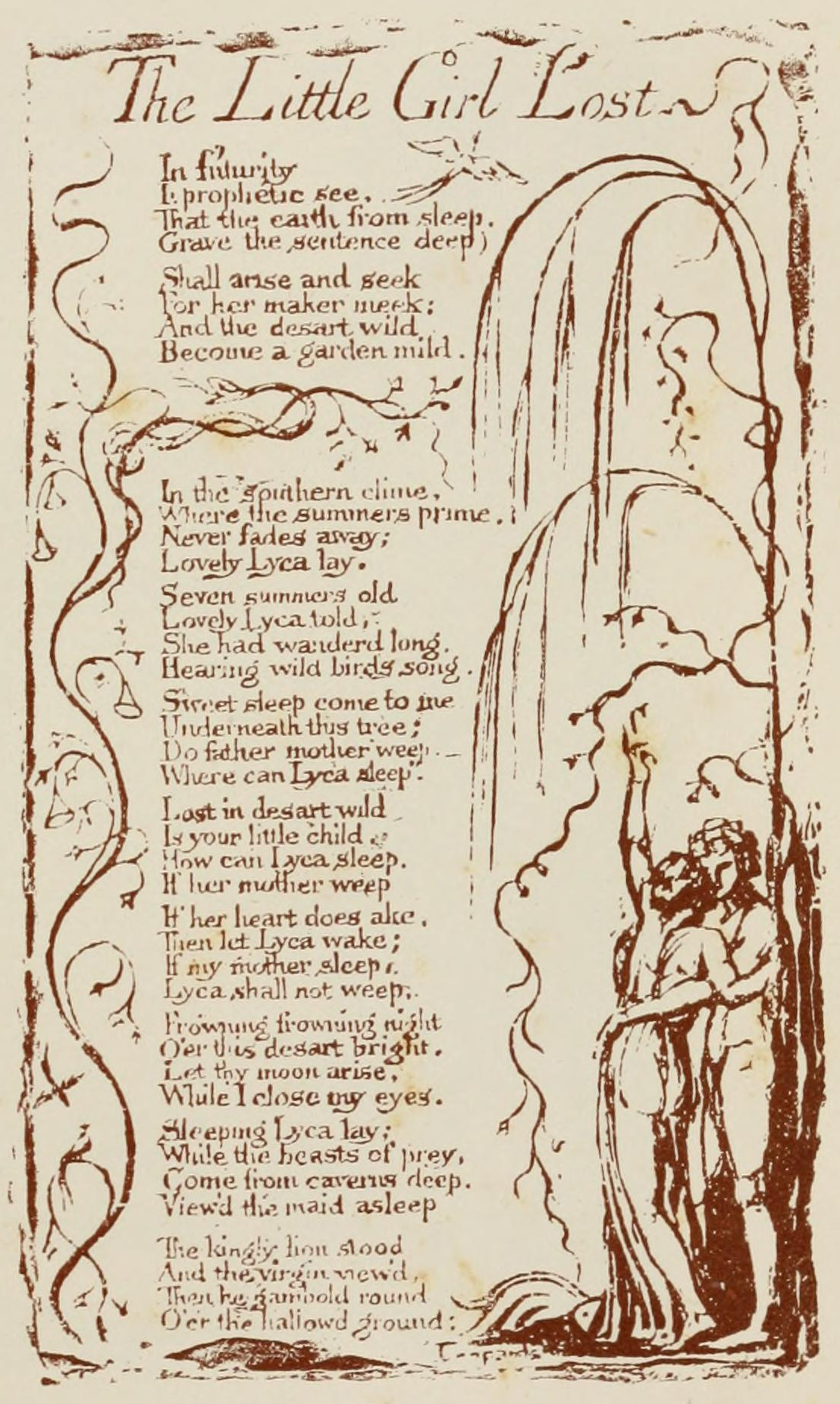

"The Little Girl Lost" is a 1794 poem published by William Blake in his collection Songs of Innocence and of Experience. According to scholar, Grevel Lindop, this poem represents Blake's pattern of the transition between "the spontaneous, imaginative Innocence of childhood" to the "complex and mature (but also more dangerous) adult state of Experience."

== Summary and structure ==
According to Lindop, the poem starts out with a prophecy from Blake during the first two stanzas. This prophecy is telling readers that "our imperfect world will one day be redeemed and renewed by the God who created it." This is not a warning of a "second-coming" or "judgement day," but just Blake believing that those on earth must seek out God. According to scholar Thomas Connolly the Earth will "awake to see her maker" and this will bring out an "Edenic regeneration." Following the prophecy, the poem's narrative begins. Lyca, the "little girl" in the poem wanders out into the wilderness. Her parents are very distressed about their lost daughter. As pointed out in Lindop's summary, "the knowledge of her parents' grief disturbs her, but she has no anxiety on her own behalf and the very beasts her parents fear treat her gently and carry her to their caves as she sleeps." The poem ends following the animals taking Lyca off to the caves.

The narrative in this poem continues in "The Little Girl Found."

"The Little Girl Lost" is a thirteen-stanza poem, has 52 lines, and follows an AABB rhyme scheme.

== Poem ==
In futurity
I prophetic see,
That the earth from sleep,
(Grave the sentence deep)

Shall arise and seek
For her maker meek:
And the desart wild
Become a garden mild.

In the southern clime,
Where the summers prime,
Never fades away;
Lovely Lyca lay.

Seven summers old
Lovely Lyca told,
She had wanderd long
Hearing wild birds song.

Sweet sleep come to me
Underneath this tree;
Do father, mother weep, —
“Where can Lyca sleep”.

Lost in desart wild
Is your little child.
How can Lyca sleep,
If her mother weep.

If her heart does ake,
Then let Lyca wake;
If my mother sleep,
Lyca shall not weep.

Frowning frowning night,
O’er this desart bright,
Let thy moon arise,
While I close my eyes.

Sleeping Lyca lay;
While the beasts of prey,
Come from caverns deep,
View’d the maid asleep

The kingly lion stood
And the virgin view’d,
Then he gambold round
O’er the hallowd ground:

Leopards, tygers play,
Round her as she lay;
While the lion old,
Bow’d his mane of gold,

And her bosom lick,
And upon her neck,
From his eyes of flame,
Ruby tears there came;

While the lioness
Loos’d her slender dress,
And naked they convey’d
To caves the sleeping maid.

== Plate ==
The plate for "The Little Girl Lost" features a couple embracing in a kiss with the woman's arm reaching upward. There is also a presence of nature with birds flying and branches hanging above the couple. A vine with a snake breaks up the first two stanzas from the rest of the poem. According to the scholars Rodney Baine and Mary Baine, the embracing lovers featured on the poem's plate helps to "suggest that Lyca journeys into the sexuality of adulthood, of experience.

== Themes and analysis ==
Throughout Blake's Songs of Innocence and Experience and as obviously stated in the title, there is a constant theme of moving from the stage of innocence to the stage of experience in his poems. According to Connolly, this transition is a sexual one. "The girl, Lyca, without guide or protector, successfully undergoes the experience of sexual maturation, despite her parents' fears; and then serves as a model to rid them of their own sexual guilt, and to introduce them to a state of innocence that they had never before experienced." An important part to this interpretation is the question of how old Lyca really is. Connolly points out lines 13–14 in reference to Lyca's age, "Seven summers old/ Lovely Lyca told." Connolly brings to our attention that while it could simply mean that Lyca is seven, it could also mean seven summers have passed since she hit puberty. If that was the case then Lyca would be at the same age as the woman depicted in the plate.

== Works cited ==
- Baine, Rodney M., and Mary R. Baine. "Blake's Other Tigers, and "the Tyger"." SEL: Studies in English Literature 1500–1900 15.4, Nineteenth Century (1975): 563-78. Web.
- Connolly, Thomas E. "'Little Girl Lost' 'Little Girl found': Blake's Reversal of the Innocence-Experience Pattern." College Literature 16.2 (1989): 148-66. Web.
- Lindop, Grevel. "Blake: 'the Little Girl Lost' and 'the Little Girl found'." Critical Survey 6.1/2 (1973): 36–40. Web.
