= The Little Boy Found =

Poem by William Blake

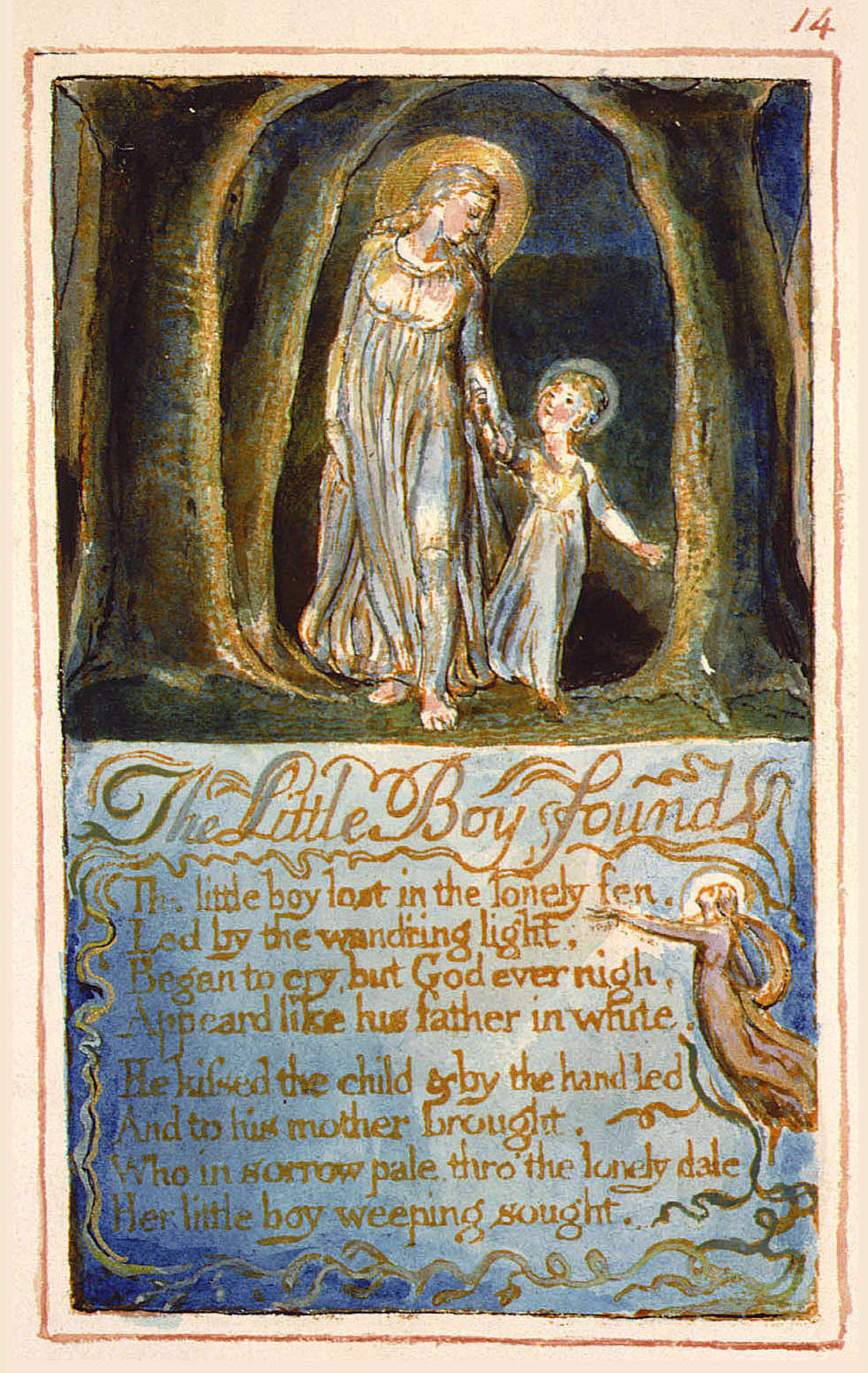
- One of Blake's prints for "Little Boy Found"

"The Little Boy Found" is a poem by William Blake first published in the collection Songs of Innocence in 1789. Songs of Innocence was printed using illuminated printing, a style Blake created. By integrating the images with the poems the reader was better able to understand the meaning behind each of Blake's poems.

"The Little Boy Found" is a sequel to "The Little Boy Lost". The two poems are written as simple songs, similar to nursery rhymes.

== The poem ==
"The Little Boy Found" by William Blake

The little boy lost in the lonely fen,
Led by the wand'ring light,
Began to cry, but God ever nigh,
Appeard like his father in white.

He kissed the child & by the hand led
And to his mother brought,
Who in sorrow pale, thro' the lonely dale
Her little boy weeping sought.

== Structure ==
The poem's rhyme scheme is ABCB DEFE, with internal rhymes (CC and FF) on the third and seventh lines (The third line of each stanza). Blake uses a form of alliteration in the first two lines, repeating the letter l in "little...lost...lonely...led...light". The repetition of sound creates a rhythmic flow, setting the tone for the rest of the poem. The poem consists of two stanzas. In the first stanza the little boy is lost in a bog, and afraid when God comes to him. In the second stanza God leads him back to his mother, who had been looking for him.

The Little Boy Found presents a pastoral setting.

== Themes ==
One of the major themes in "The Little Boy Found" is the presence of God in people's lives. This is explicitly said in line 4. God is a common topic in Blake's poetry, especially in Songs of Innocence and Songs of Experience. In "The Little Boy Found" being 'lost' does not always refer to literally being lost. It can also refer to being lost in life, such as drug addiction or just being out of touch. Although Blake was a religious man, God does not always refer to the deity that most people associate with the name. It could also mean the loving connections and relationships that people have with other people. According to the article 'Pictorial and Poetic Design in Two Songs of Innocence' by Thomas Connolly "some individuals are maimed because they are exposed to destructive experience without the shielding protection of a guardian." In "The Little Boy Found" the boy has been lost, and wandering. He is then led by the light of God. God appears as his father in white; this portraying God's innocence. He is then led by God to his mother. The fact that the boy was lost signifies that he might have strayed from his original innocence. However, through the guidance of God he is led back to his mother, this exemplifies the pureness and innocence of children.

== Gallery ==
Scholars agree that "The Little Boy Found" is the 14th object in the order of the original printings of the Songs of Innocence and of Experience. The following, represents a comparison of several of the extant copies of the poem, their print date, their order in that particular binding of the book of poems, and their holding institution:

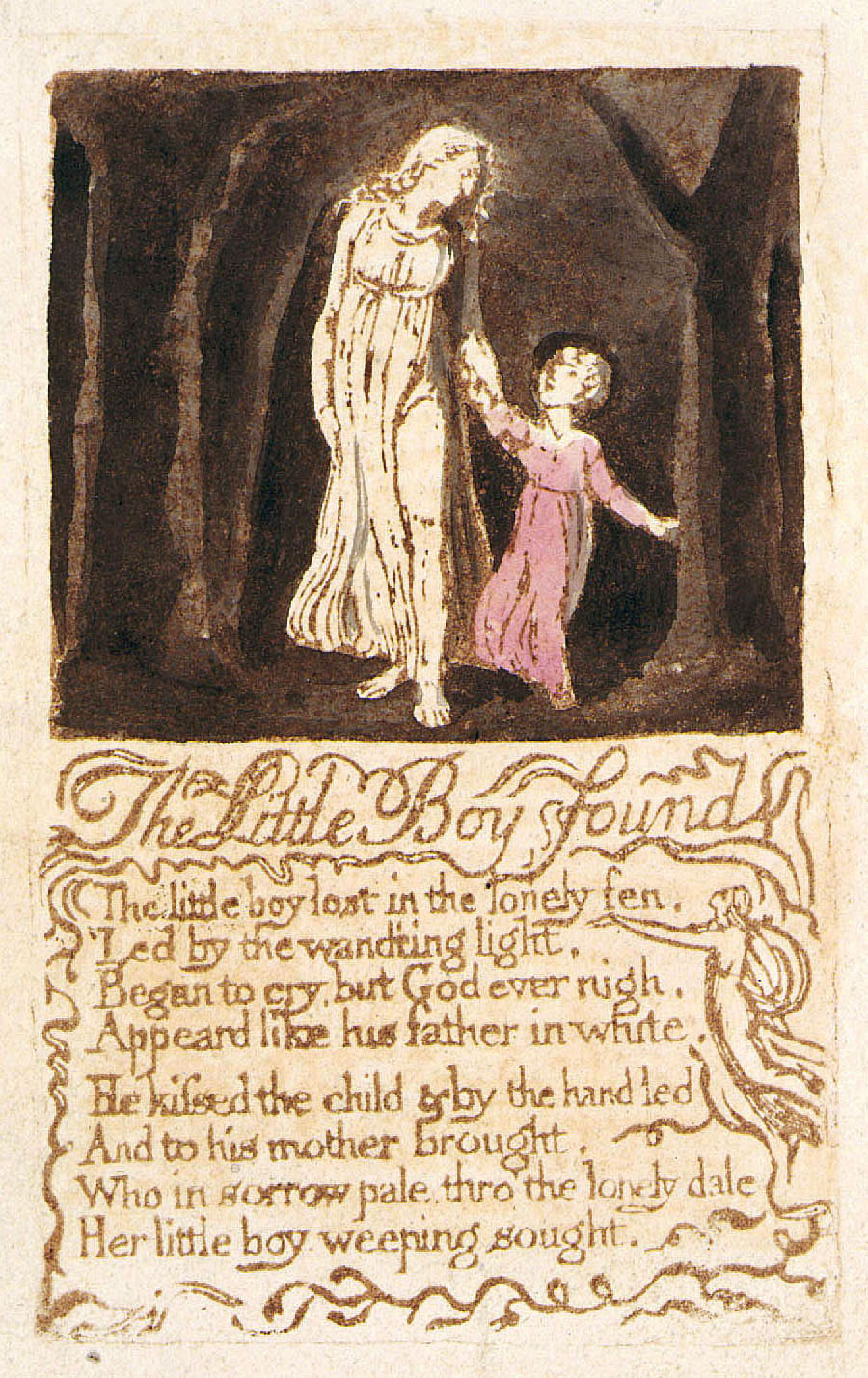
Songs of Innocence, copy B, 1789 (Library of Congress) object 23

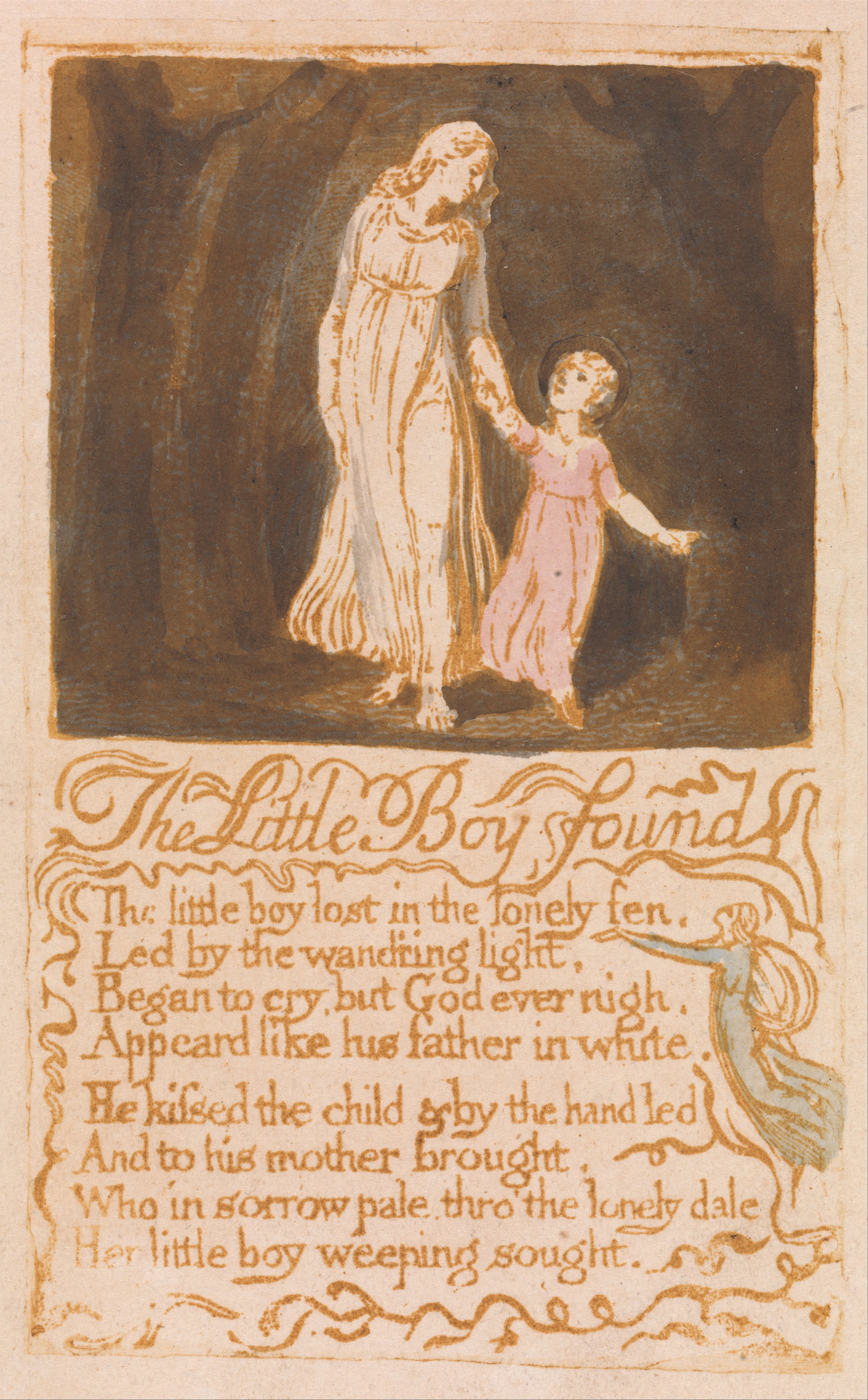
Songs of Innocence, copy G, 1789 (Yale Center for British Art) object 21

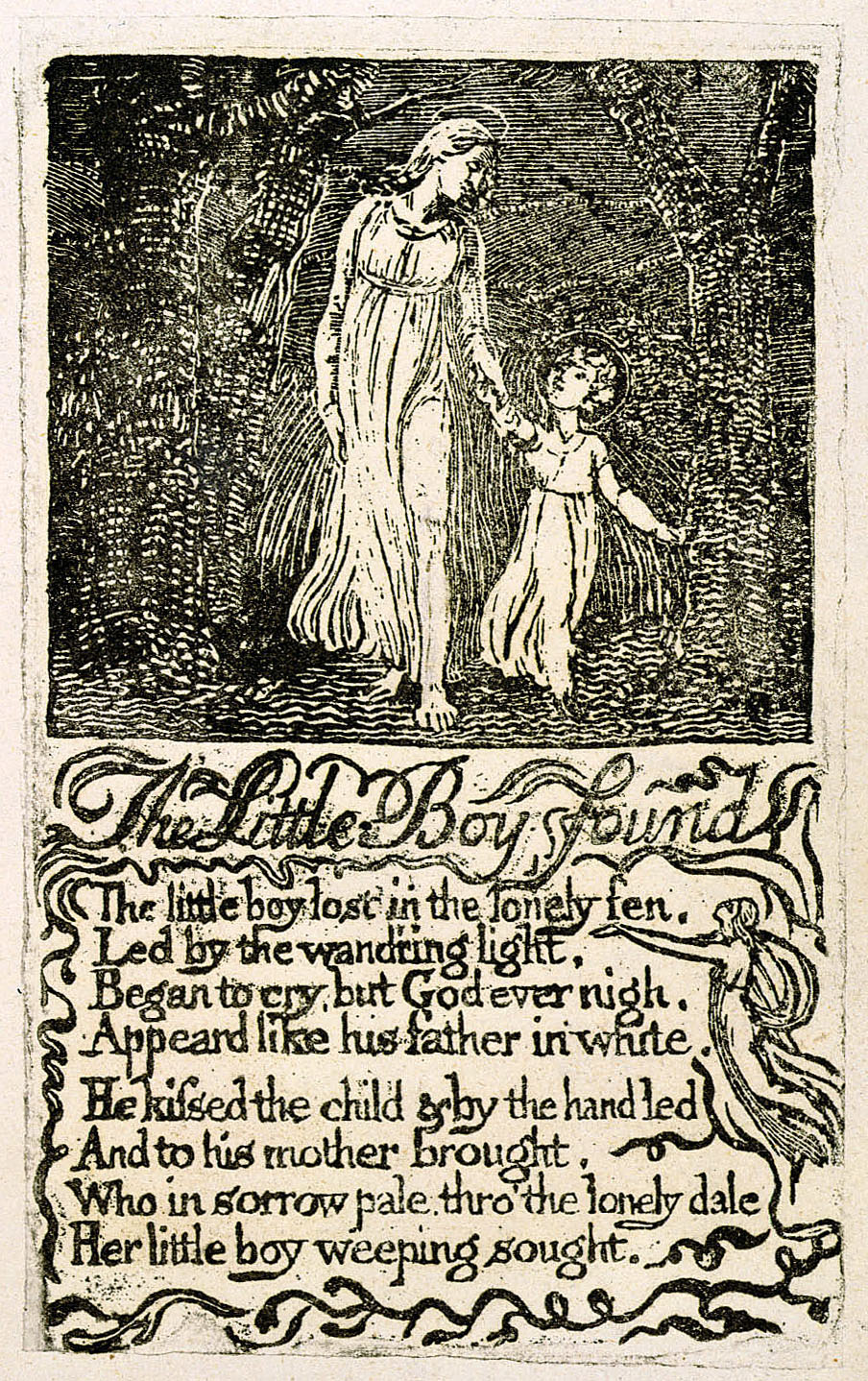
Songs of Innocence, copy U, 1789 (Houghton Library) object 15 The Little Boy Found

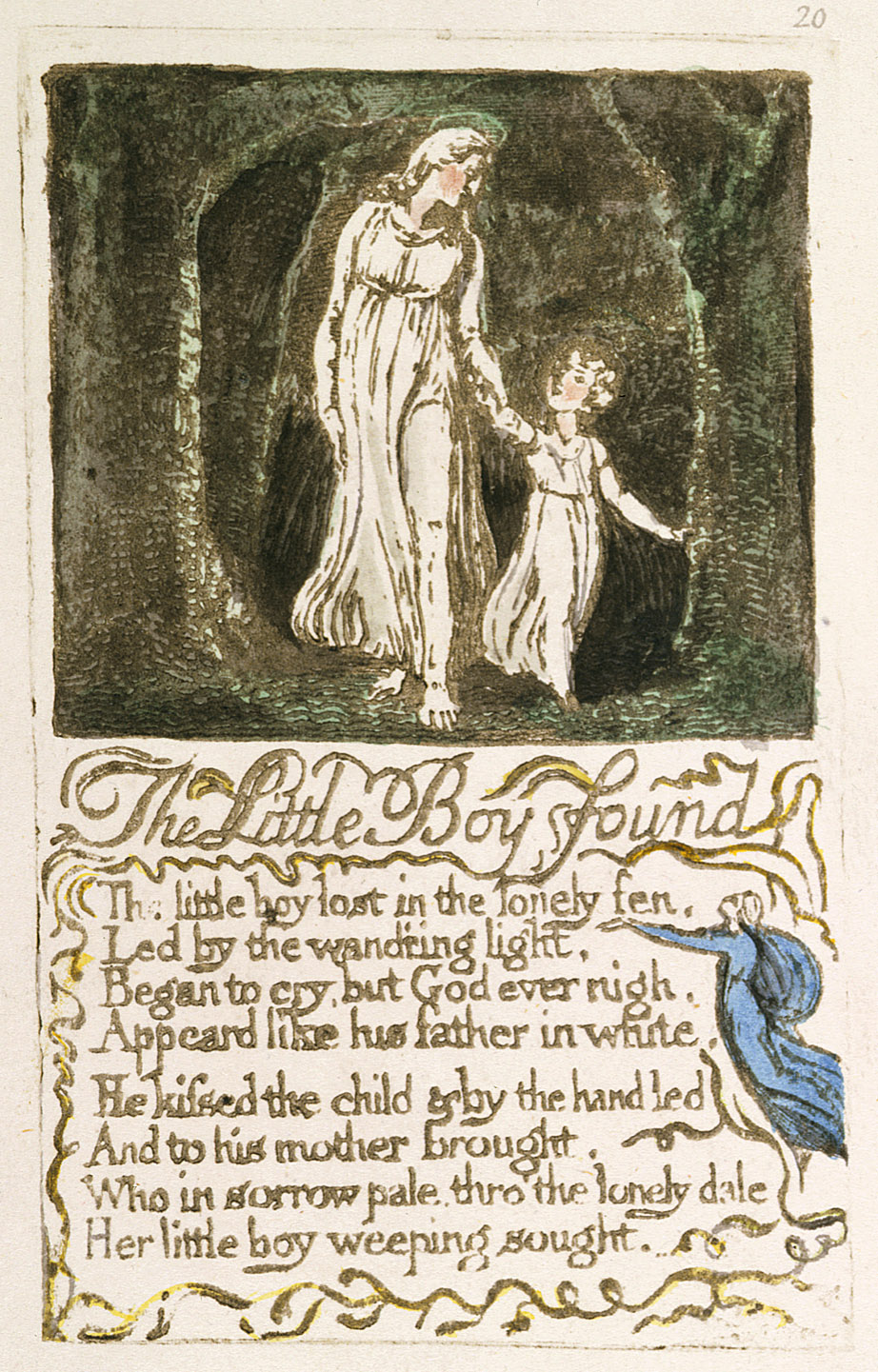
Songs of Innocence and of Experience, copy A, 1795 (British Museum) object 22

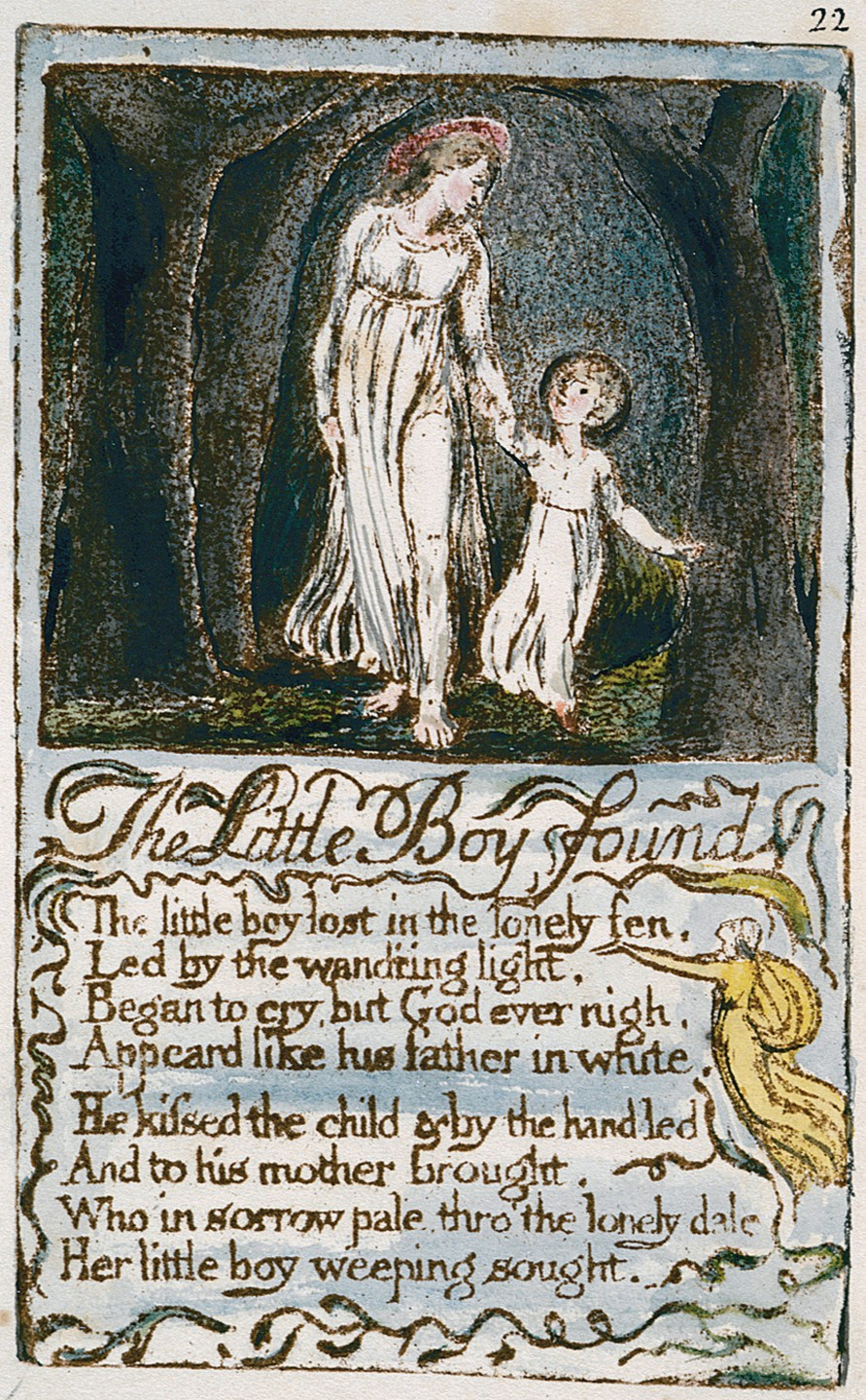
Songs of Innocence and of Experience, copy L, 1795 (Yale Center for British Art) object 22

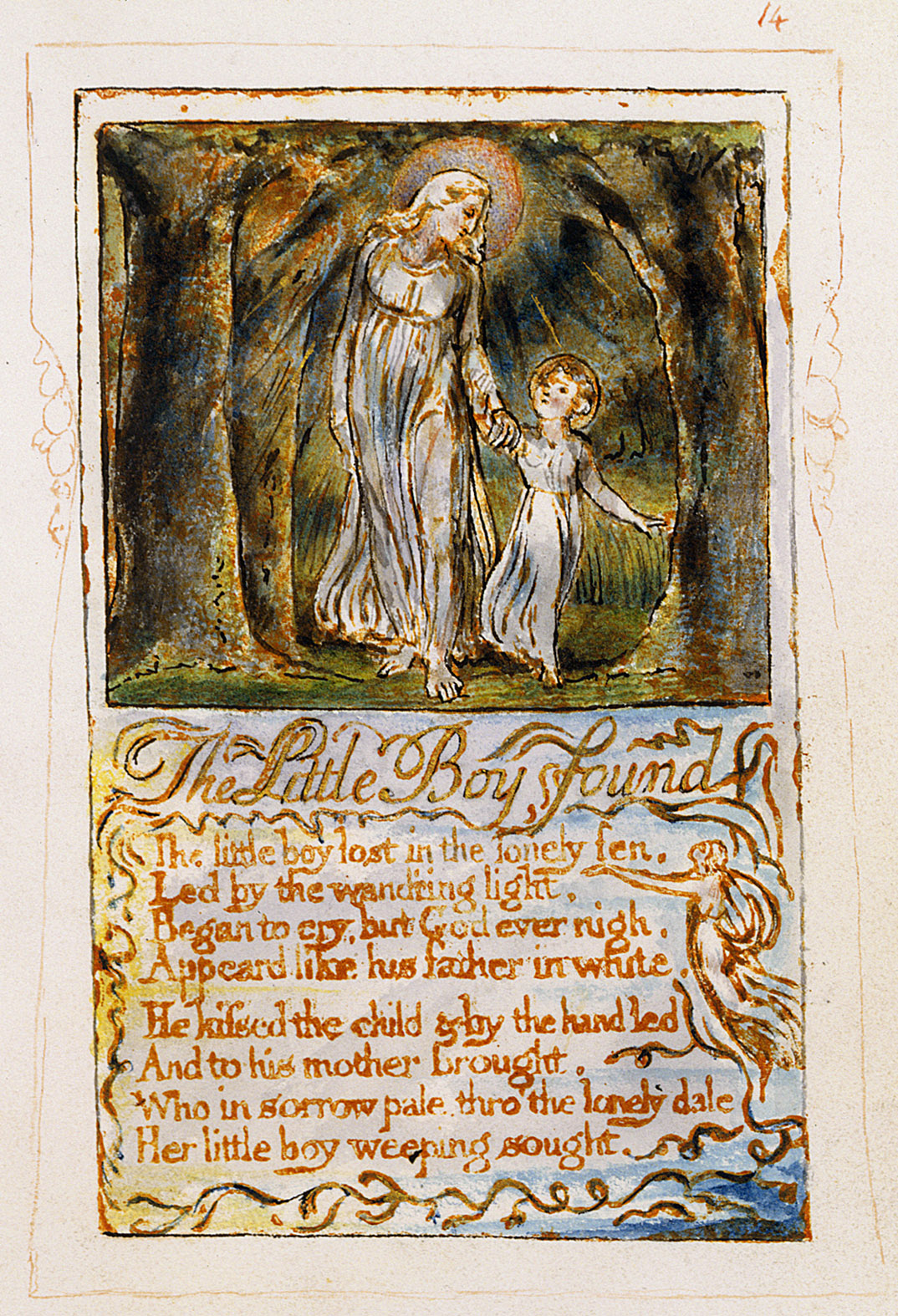
Songs of Innocence and of Experience, copy Y, 1825 (Metropolitan Museum of Art), object 14

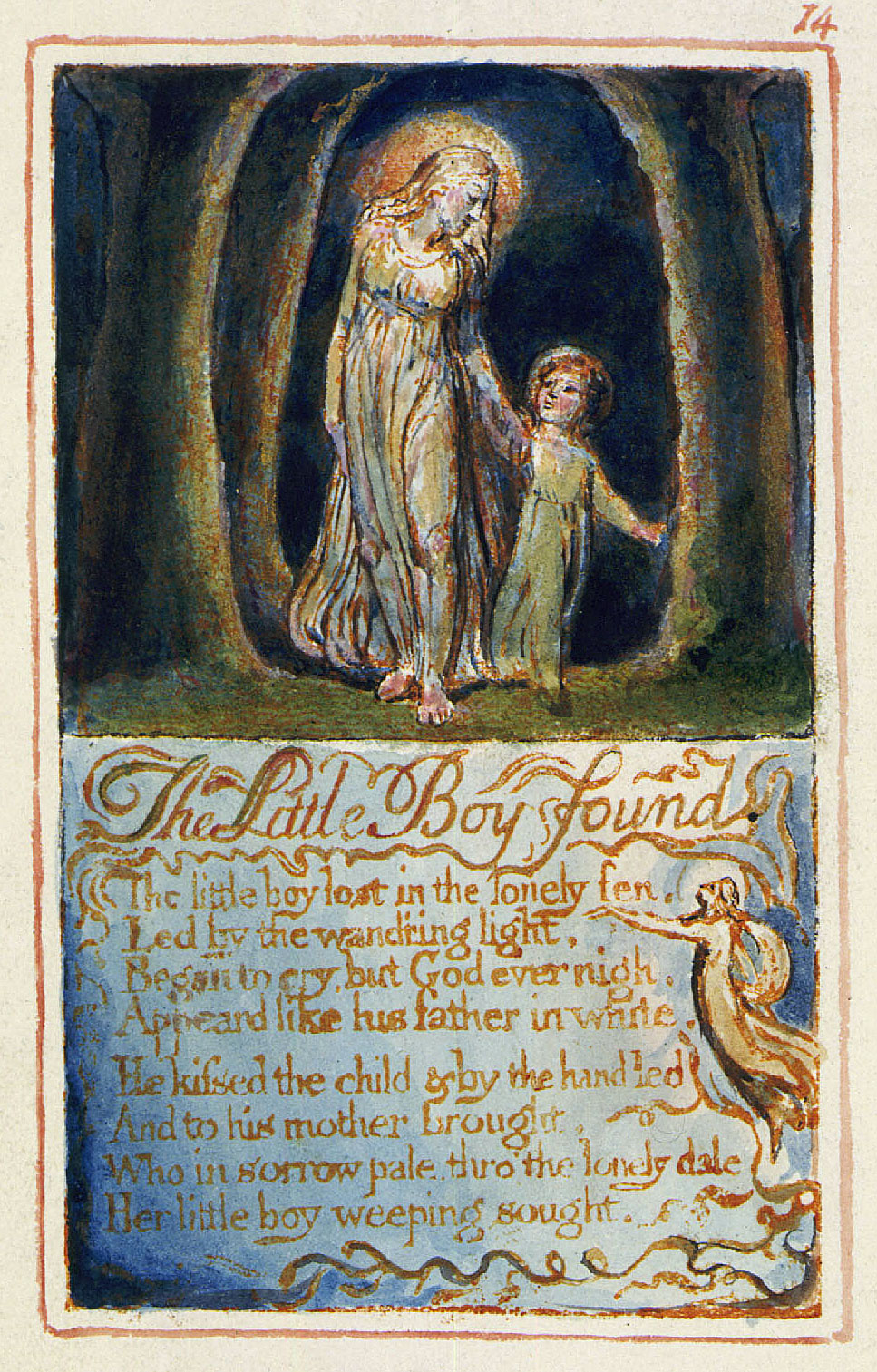
Songs of Innocence and of Experience, copy Z, 1826 (Library of Congress) object 14

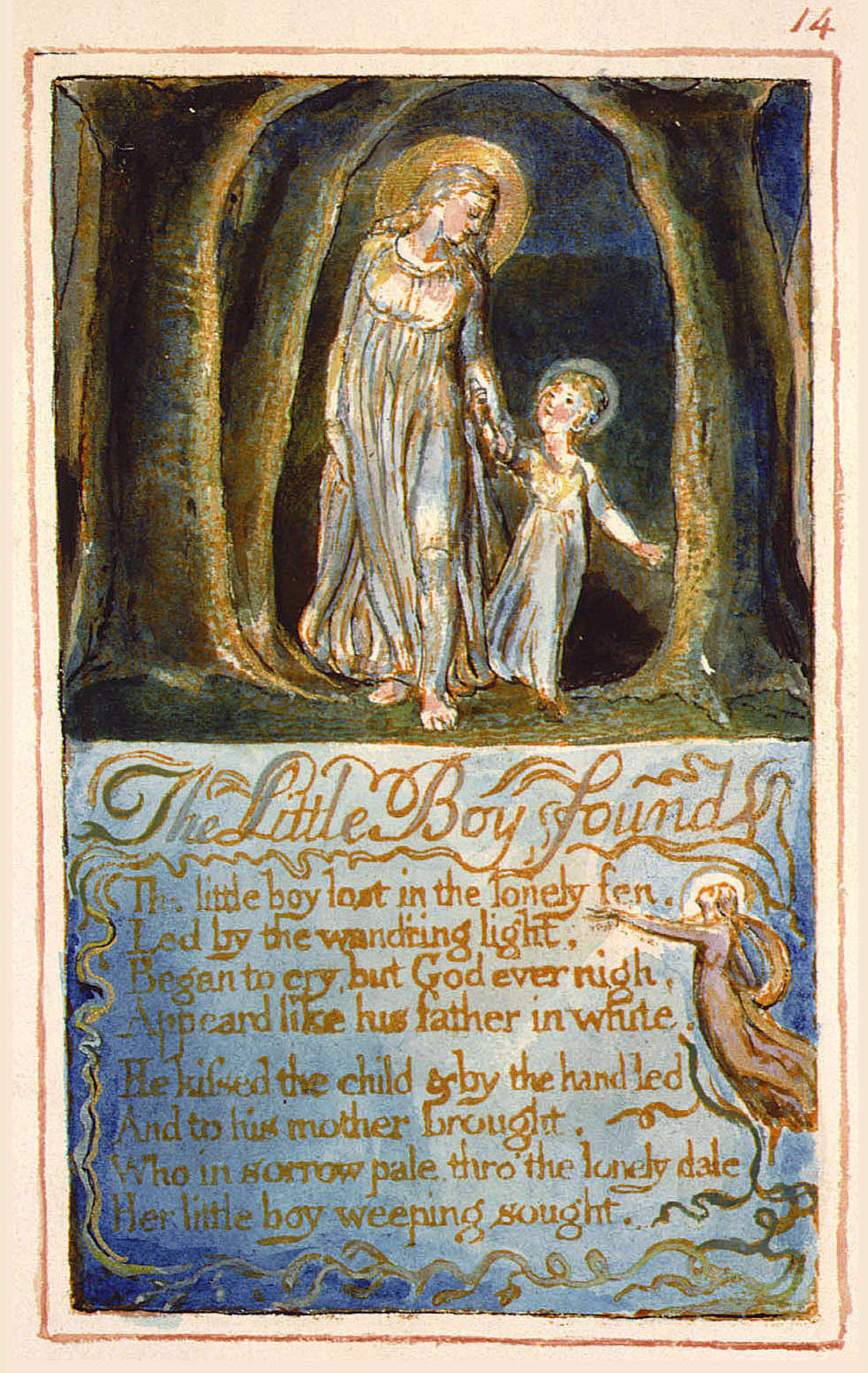
Songs of Innocence and of Experience, copy AA, 1826 (The Fitzwilliam Museum) object 14
