= The Little Girl Found =

1794 poem by William Blake

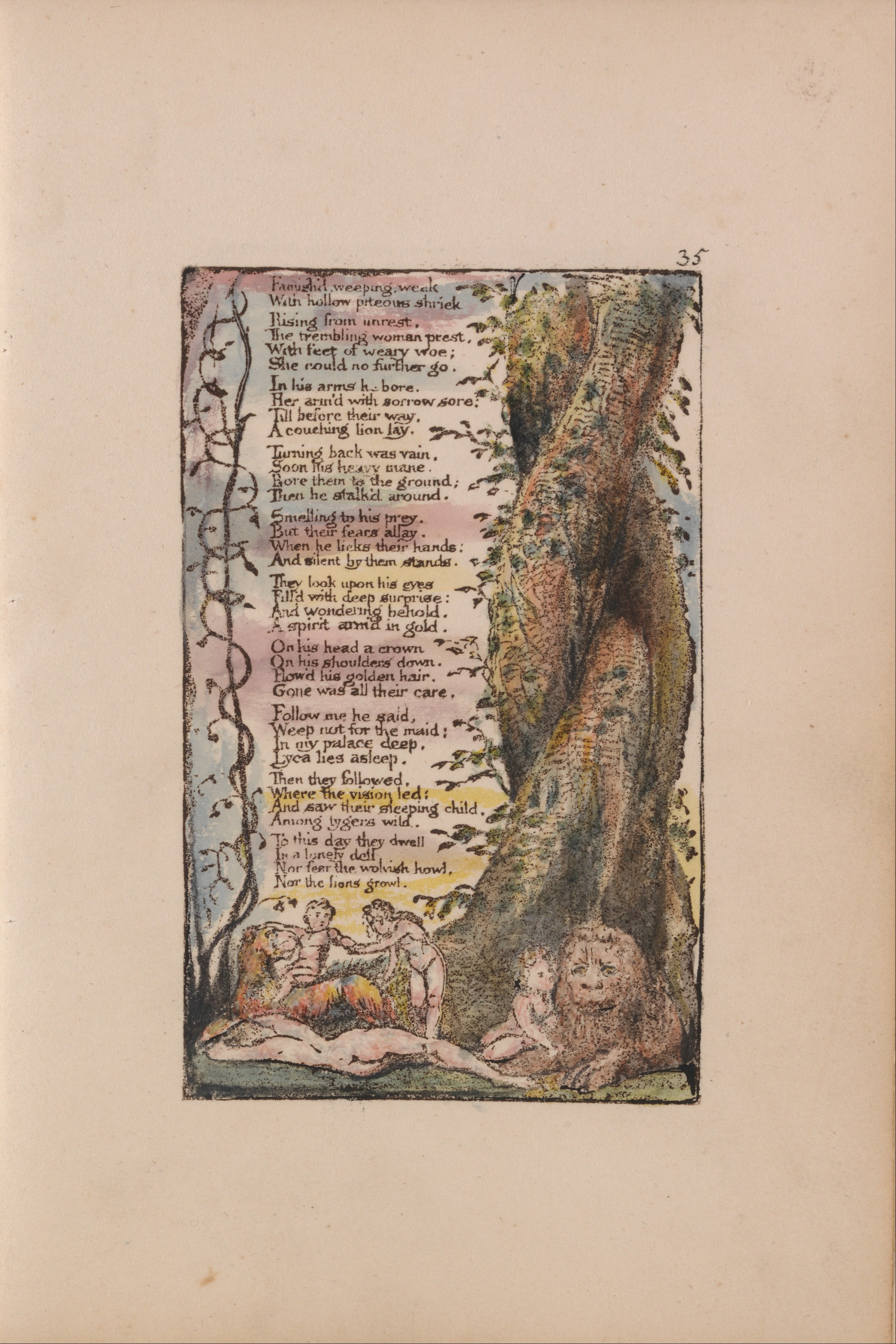
William Blake, The Little Girl Found, from Songs of Innocence and of Experience, 1794

"The Little Girl Found" is a poem written by the English poet William Blake. It was published as part of his collection Songs of Experience in 1794. In the poem, the parents of a seven-year-old girl, called Lyca, are looking desperately for their young daughter who is lost in the desert. During days and nights they go on looking for the girl up to the moment they find a lion which tells them where the child lies.

== The poem ==
The poem begins with a girl's parents searching for her:

All the night in woe,
Lyca's parents go:
Over vallies deep,
While the desarts weep.

Tired and woe-begone,
Hoarse with making moan:
Arm in arm seven days,
They trac'd the desart ways.

— Stanzas 1 and 2

At last, a spirit guides them to her:

Then they followed,
Where the vision led:
And saw their sleeping child,
Among tygers wild.

To this day they dwell
In a lonely dell
Nor fear the wolvish howl,
Nor the lions growl.

— Stanzas 12 and 13

== Analysis ==
As a resolution to "The Little Girl Lost", this poem shows the fulfilling of Blake's image of the 'desert wild become a garden mild'; the parents' perceptions of nature have changed, and they no longer fear their natural surroundings. Blake uses this to demonstrate that positive change away from corrupt experience is possible, but only through an acceptance of that which is natural. Crucially, this poem gives hope in the surrounding bleak view of Songs of Experience, and is an effective example of a retreat into nature to learn and develop, an important motif in pastoral literature.
