= Carlos Wilcox =

American poet

Carlos Wilcox (October 22, 1794 – May 29, 1827) was an American poet. Born at Newport, New Hampshire, Wilcox was a Congregationalist minister. He wrote a poem, The Age of Benevolence, which was left unfinished, and which was clearly influenced by the work of William Cowper.
