= The Little Boy Lost =

1789 poem by William Blake

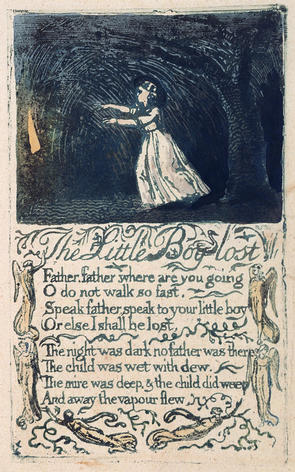
The Little Boy Lost illuminated drawing

"The Little Boy Lost" is a simple lyric poem written by William Blake. This poem is part of a larger work titled Songs of Innocence which was published in the year 1789. "The Little Boy Lost" is a prelude to "The Little Boy Found".

== Summary ==
Reading of "The Little Boy Lost"

Father, father, where are you going
O do not walk so fast.
Speak father, speak to your little boy
Or else I shall be lost,

The night was dark no father was there
The child was wet with dew.
The mire was deep, & the child did weep
And away the vapour flew.

== Interpretation ==
Upon the publication of "The Little Boy Lost" and Songs of Innocence, people of Blake's time perceived the compilation of poems as a children's book because it was easy to read, the poems were very short, meant to be sung, and were accompanied by colourful illustrations.

In modern times, however, much deeper understanding of the poem has developed. One can not analyse a poem by William Blake without noting its themes that come from the Christian faith. Some interpret the poem as representing the relationship between humans and our spiritual lives with the Biblical God. The father represents earthly pleasures that we might end up following. A person can become lost in a spiritual journey by acting on impulse; following drugs, a lavish lifestyle, or anything else that goes against Biblical principles. Like the little boy covered in mud, adults who have followed the wrong "god" to a life of sin are covered in that sin and completely lost.

== Literary devices ==
"The Little Boy Lost" is a two stanza poem with eight total lines. It is written in ballad metre (essentially a loose common metre). In the poem Blake uses internal rhyme in line 7 "The mire was deep, & the child did weep" with the words "weep" and "deep". This played a role in the simplicity of reading the poem. The use of caesuras throughout the poem also contributes to the easy reading, giving the reader a chance to slowly read and take in the words and meanings. The repetition words, such as "Father", put an emphasis on the meaning of Father in the piece. The title "Father" serves the use of ambiguity, because one may interpret different meaning from the word. The poem itself is ambiguous, because it has its literal meaning and religious meaning. Blake incorporated symbolism in line 9 "And away the vapour flew", "vapour" symbolise the "Father" from the beginning of the poem.

== Gallery ==
Scholars agree that "The Little Boy Lost" is the 13th object in the order of the original printings of the Songs of Innocence and of Experience. The following, represents a comparison of several of the extant copies of the poem, their print date, their order in that particular binding of the book of poems, and their holding institution:

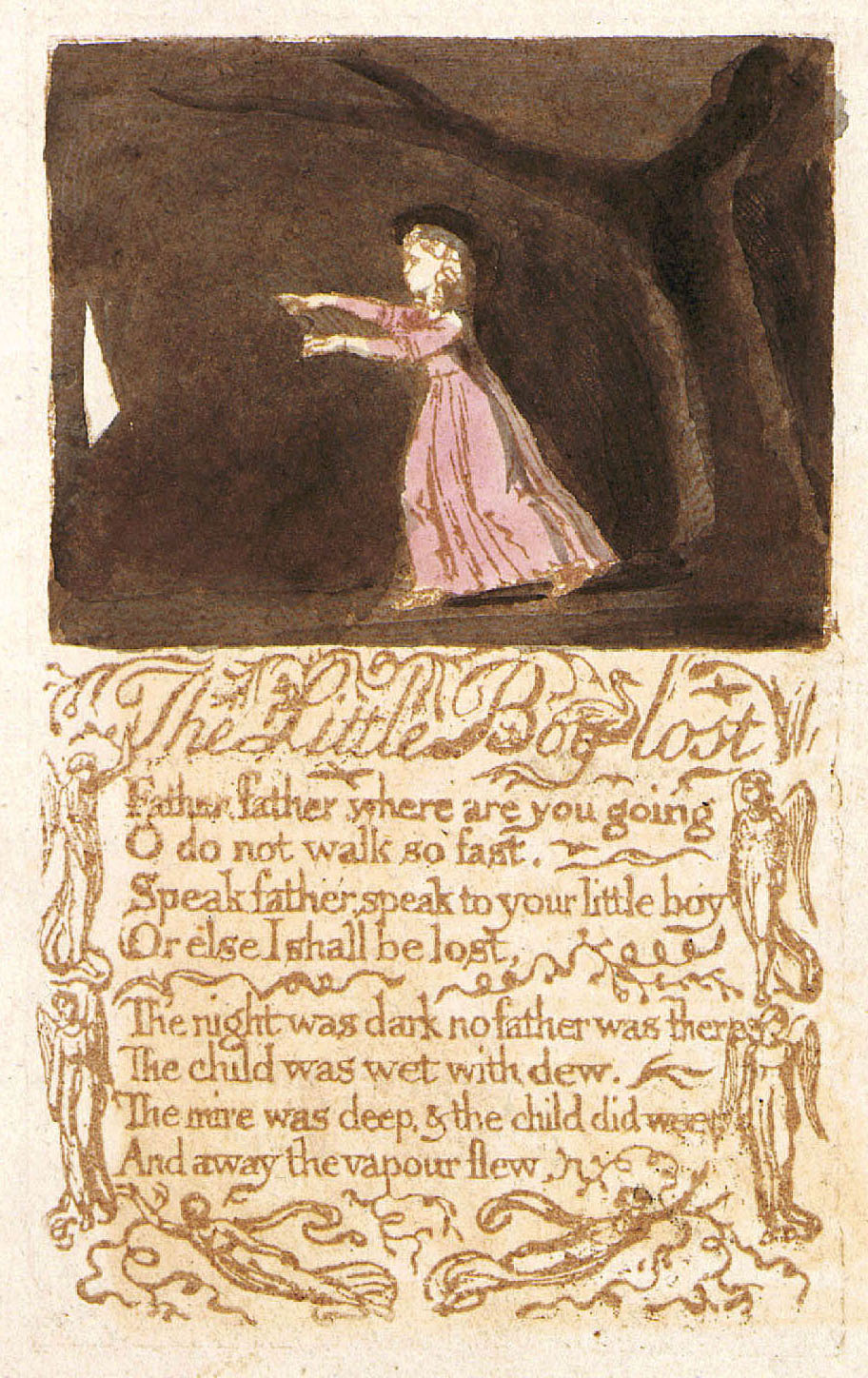
Songs of Innocence, copy B, 1789 (Library of Congress) object 22

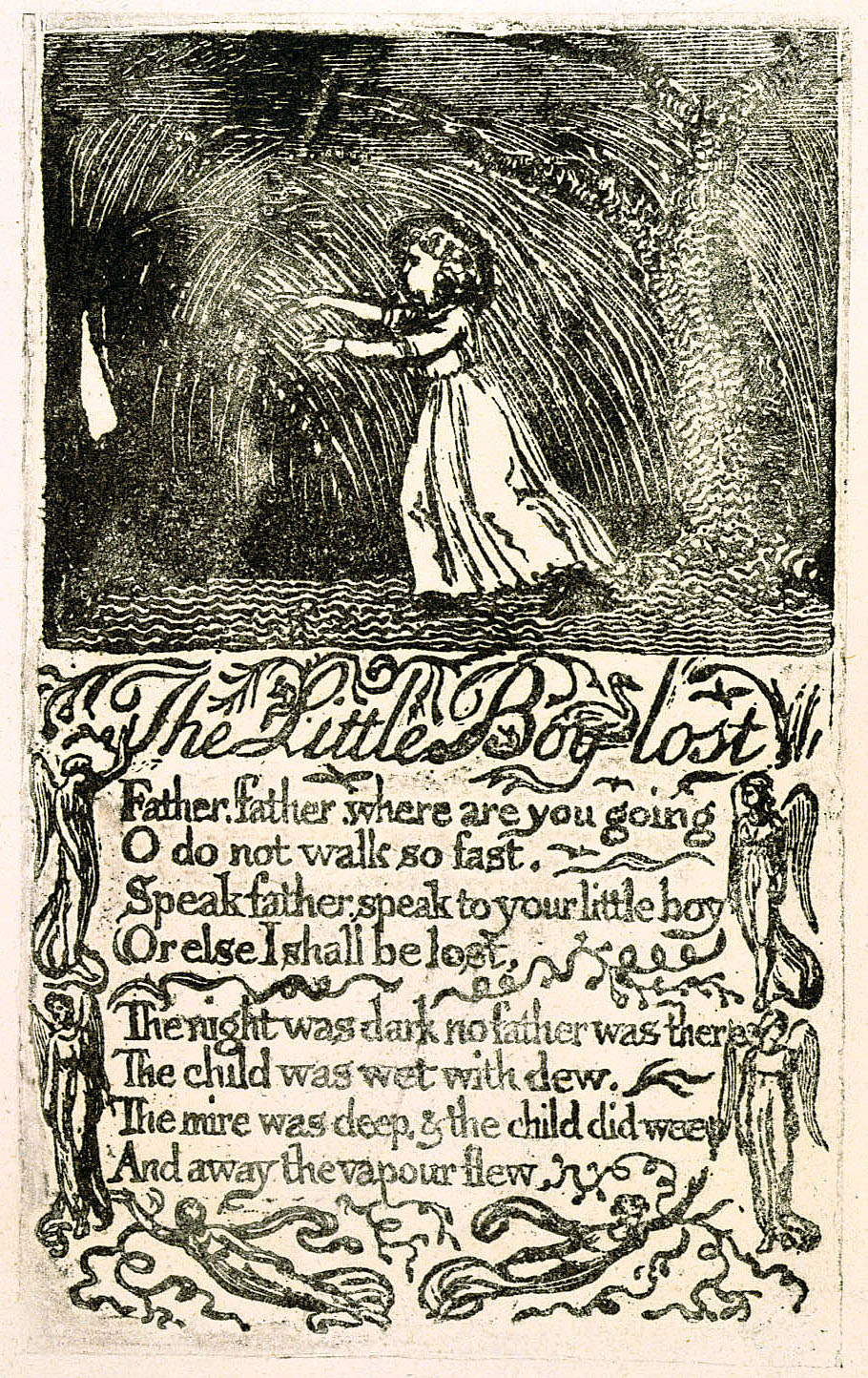
Songs of Innocence, copy U, 1789 (Houghton Library) object 14

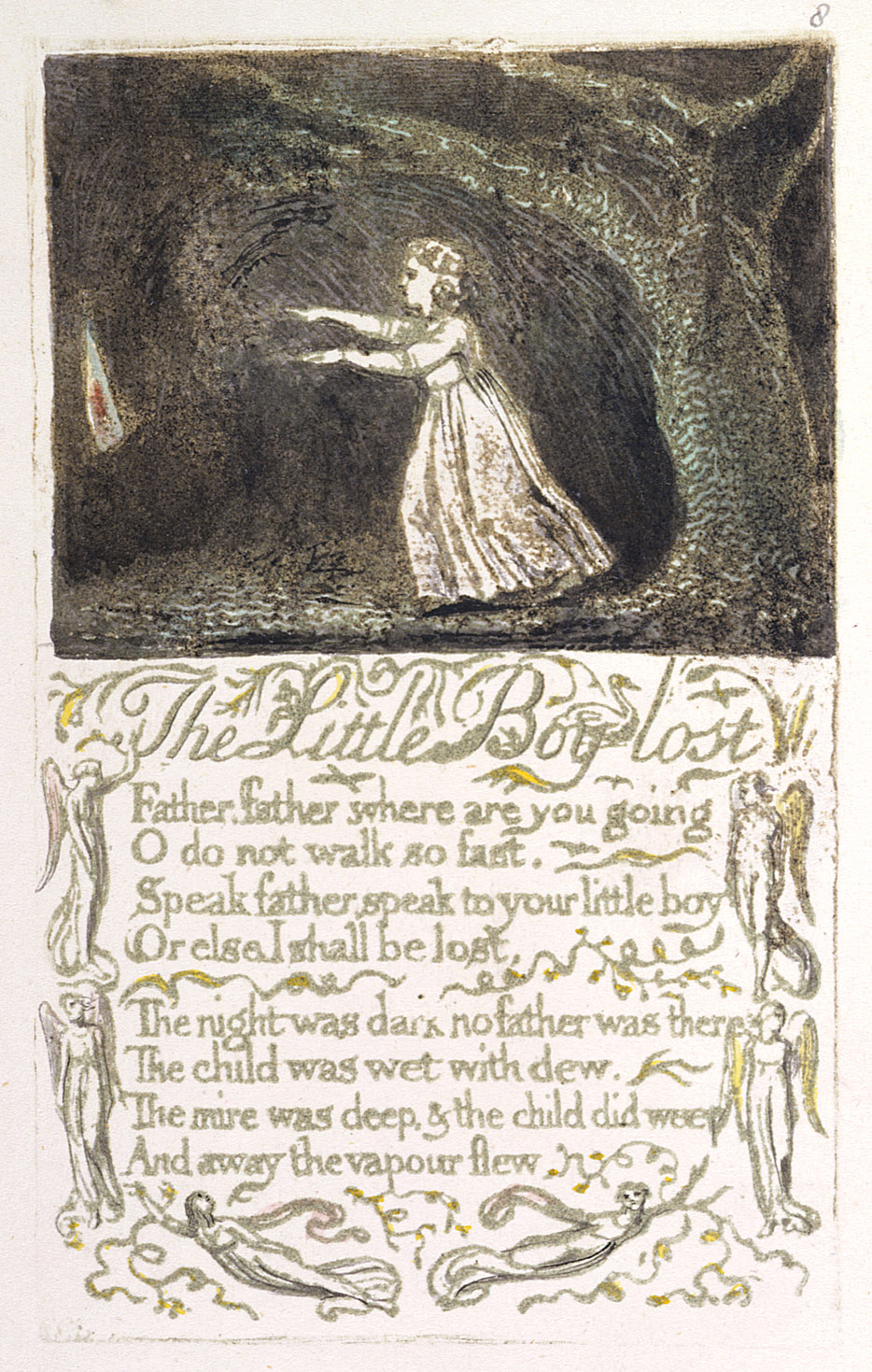
Songs of Innocence and of Experience, copy A, 1795 (British Museum) object 10

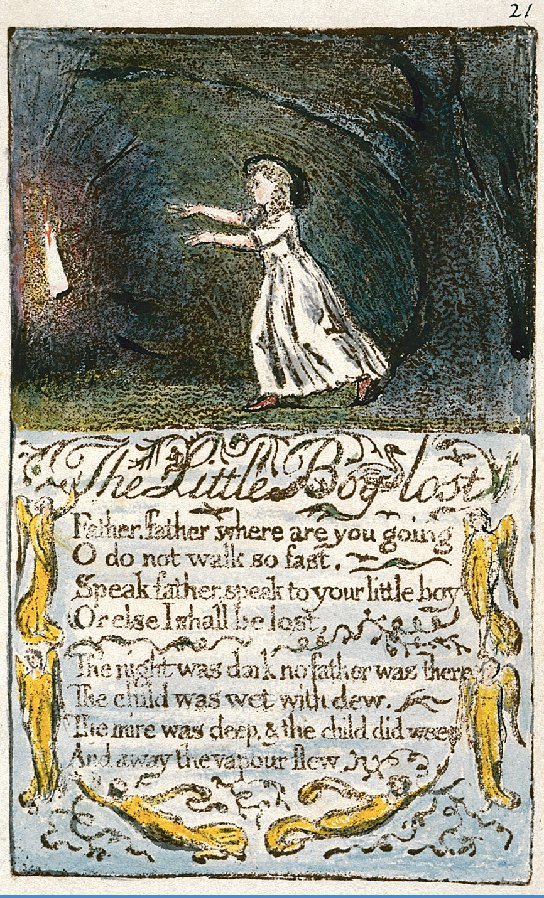
Songs of Innocence and of Experience, copy L, 1795 (Yale Center for British Art) object 21

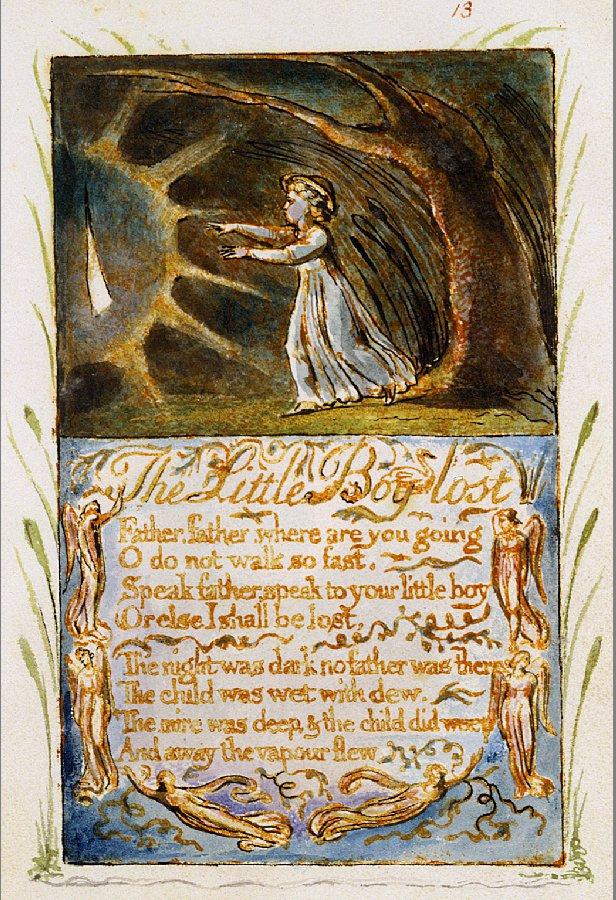
Songs of Innocence and of Experience, copy Y, 1825 (Metropolitan Museum of Art) object 13

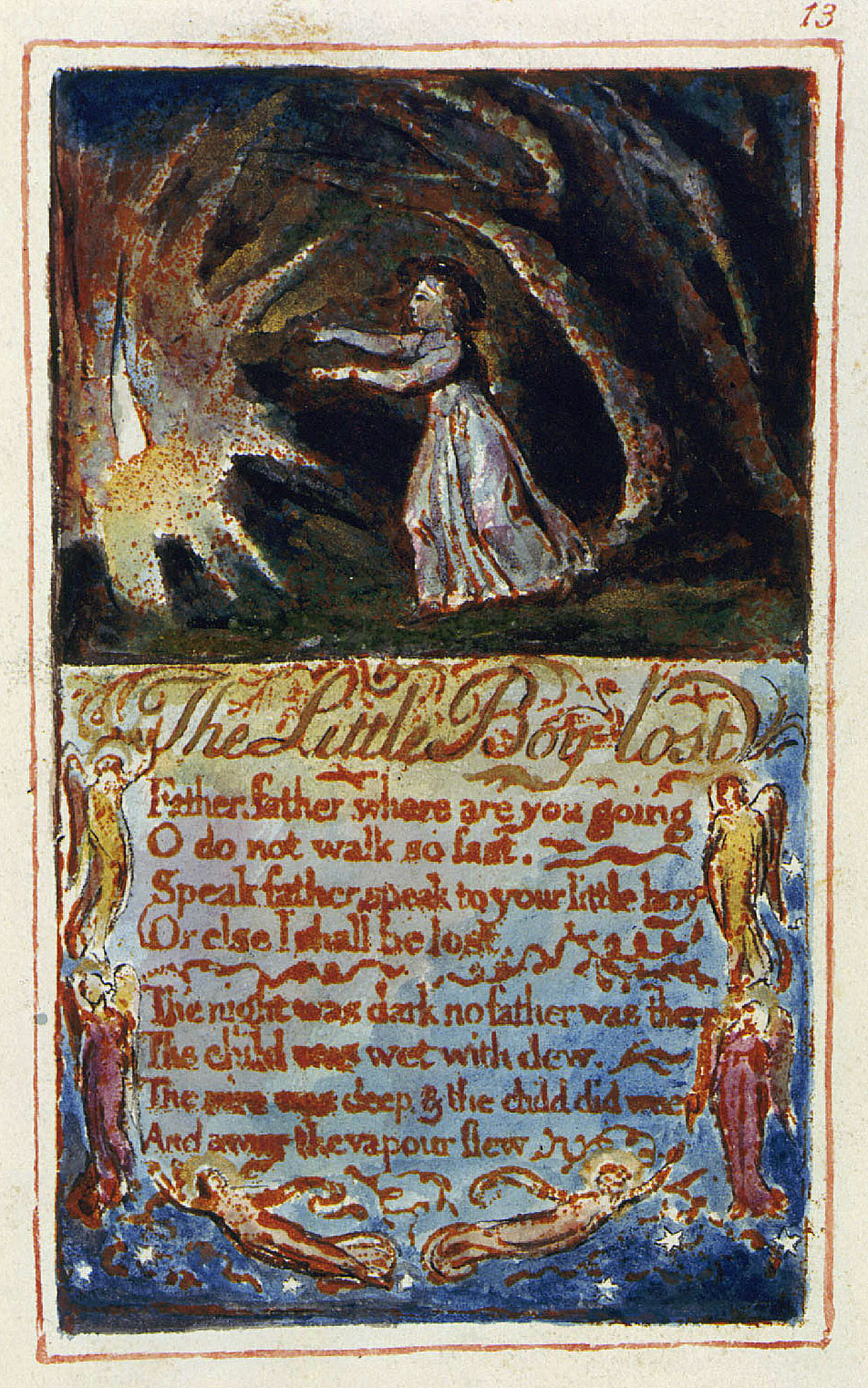
Songs of Innocence and of Experience, copy Z, 1826 (Library of Congress) object 13

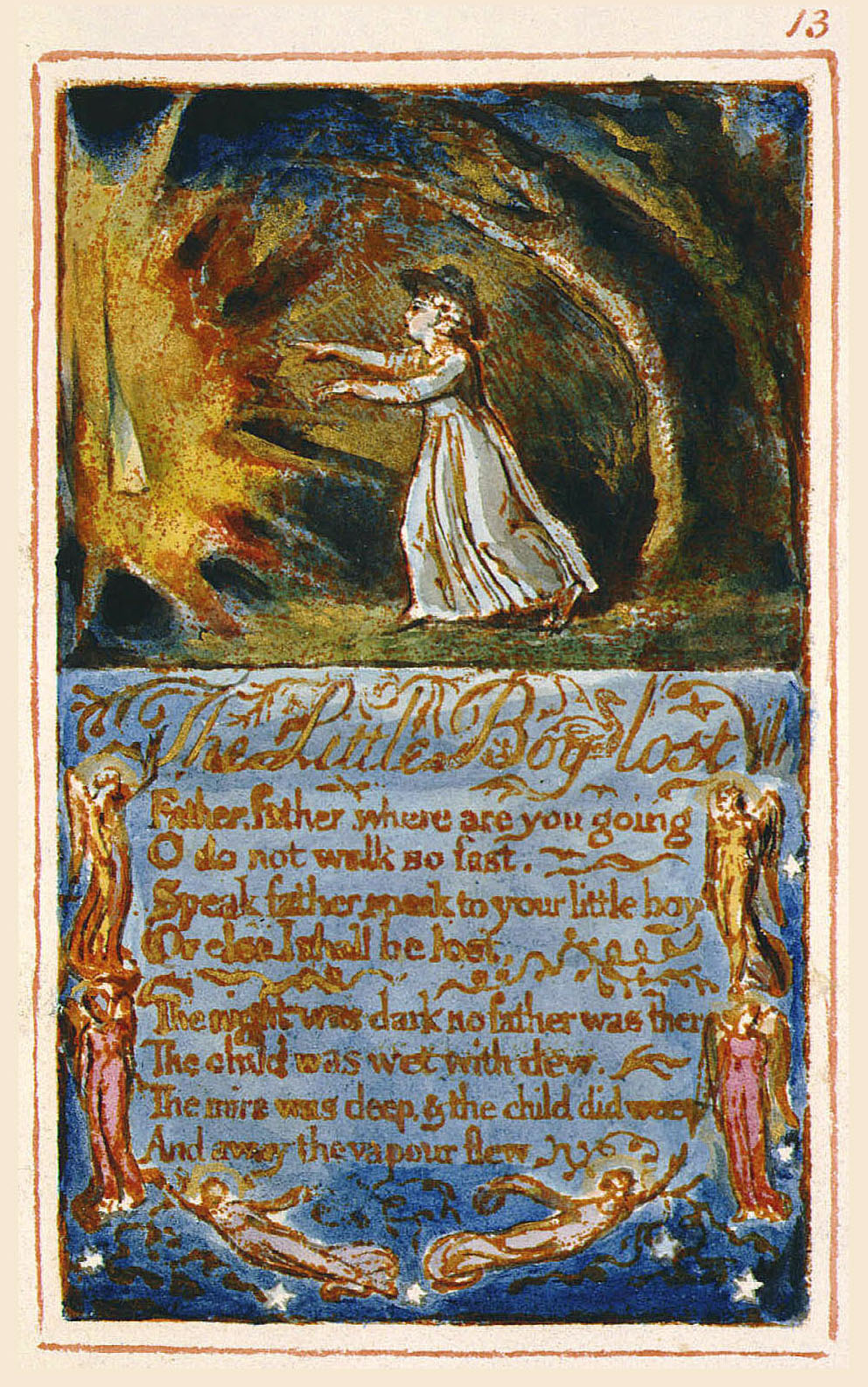
Songs of Innocence and of Experience, copy AA, 1826 (The Fitzwilliam Museum) Object 13
