= Sonnets on Eminent Characters =

Sonnets on Eminent Characters or Sonnets on Eminent Contemporaries is an 11-part sonnet series created by Samuel Taylor Coleridge and printed in the Morning Chronicle between 1 December 1794 and 31 January 1795. Although Coleridge promised to have at least 16 poems within the series, only one addition poem, "To Lord Stanhope", was published.

The poems have been moderately received and emphasized for what they reveal about Coleridge's political and philosophical feelings during his early years. Within the poems, he praises 10 individuals that he treats as his heroes along and denounces two people that he feels have turned against their country and liberty. The sonnet series has been compared to John Milton's addressing of sonnets to his own contemporaries in both the types of individuals chosen and the style of composition.

== Background ==
When "To Erskine" was published in the 1 December 1794 Morning Chronicle, a note addressed to the editor was printed before it and read: "If, Sir, the following Poems will not disgrace your poetical department, I will transmit you a series of Sonnets (as it is the fashion to call them), addressed, like these, to eminent Contemporaries." Following the poem was a note by the editor that read, "Our elegant Correspondent will highly gratify every reader of taste by the continuance of his exquisitely beautiful productions. No. II. shall appear on an early day."

Many sonnets were to follow after with each addressed to different people: Edmund Burke (9 December 1794), Joseph Priestley (11 December), Fayette (15 December), Kosciusko (16 December), Pitt (23 December), Bowles (26 December), Mrs Siddons (29 December), William Godwin (10 January 1795), Robert Southey (14 January), and Sheridan (29 January). Each sonnet was numbered with a total of 11 sonnets published as Sonnets to Eminent Characters. In a letter dated 11 December 1794, Coleridge told Southey that there were 10 sonnets composed and a plan for 6 more. However, he stopped at 11 by 29 January. In a letter dated 10 March 1795, Coleridge wrote to George Dyer explaining that he would write five additional sonnets for the series. Of these, only one is documented to have existed; Coleridge wrote one to Lord Stanhope, but the sonnet was never published in the Morning Chronicle.

The poems in the series, except for "To Godwin" and "To Southey", were printed in Coleridge's 1796 collection of poems. However, Coleridge began to doubt himself and he considered the poems more the property of Joseph Cottle, the publisher, than his own. He also felt that the poems were a failed attempt at following the style of John Milton. In what possibly refers specifically to the Sonnets on Eminent Characters, Coleridge wrote to Thomas Poole and said "My poetic Vanity & my political Furore have been exhaled; and I would rather be an expert, self-maintaining Gardener than a Milton, if I could not unite both."

== Poems ==
Although the poems were published as Sonnets on Eminent Characters and numbered, they were not written as a set.

=== To the Hon Mr Erskine ===
"To the Hon Mr Erskine" was first published in the 1 December 1794 Morning Chronicle. Thomas Erskine, a member of the Whig party, was a lawyer that served as a defender during the 1794 Treason Trials. Erskine, unlike others during the trial, did not accept money for his services. This was a point that Coleridge emphasized when praising Erskine as it represented a purity that Coleridge appreciated.

Erskine's defense led Coleridge to consider him as among his heroes, and the poem was written after Erskine was triumphant in his defense of those put on trial. The sonnet would later be evoked within the final issue of his political newspaper The Watchman as Coleridge describes John Thelwall, one of those Erskine defended, as successor to Erskine.

=== To Burke ===
"To Burke" was first published in the 9 December 1794 Morning Chronicle and was included in Coleridge's 1796 collection of poems with a note that criticized Edmund Burke for taking a government pension. Of all the Sonnets on Eminent Characters, only "To Burke" and "To Pitt" are addressed to people that Coleridge disagreed with at the time of their composition.

Coleridge's disagreement with Burke stems from Coleridge's support of the French Revolution. To Coleridge, Burke supported oppression while disguising it with the rhetoric of "Freedom". As such, Coleridge describes Burke as a male who seeks to harm a feminine incarnation of Freedom, and that Freedom at the end of the poem wishes to restore him as a proper son. The poem also discusses Burke's genius and believes that Burke was intelligent but wrong. William Wordsworth, Coleridge's friend, would also discuss Burke's genius years later in The Prelude Book 7.

=== To Priestley ===
"To Priestley" was first published in the 11 December 1794 Morning Chronicle. After a mob burned Joseph Priestley's Birmingham house during the summer of 1791, he left England for America. The mob was motivated by Priestley's support of the French Revolution. Coleridge was in correspondence with Priestley at the time in order to discuss Coleridge and Robert Southey's idea of Pantisocracy. In general, Coleridge viewed Priestley as both a spiritual and intellectual leader, and Coleridge's political life was to spread Priestley's views after Priestley left for America.

Like many of the sonnets, "To Priestley" was dedicated to an individual that Coleridge viewed as one of his heroes. The imagery within the poem is a reversal of those within "To Burke" with an emphasis on Priestley being a defender of freedom and without flaws. Coleridge's views on Priestley appear in many of his works, including Religious Musings written at the end of 1794.

=== To Fayette ===
"To Fayette" was first published in the 15 December 1794 Morning Chronicle. In the 1796 edition of the poem, a footnote was added to line 14 which explained the connection of the poem to the events in Gilbert du Motier, marquis de Lafayette's life: "The above beautiful Sonnet was written antecedently to the joyful account of the Patriot's escape from the Tyrant's Dungeon." Lafayette was involved in the American Revolution serving as a major-general and served in France as the commander of the National Guard between 1789 and 1791 after the Bastille fell. After the French monarch was removed, he was imprisoned in Austria and was not released until 1797.

Like many of the Romantic poets, Coleridge saw those who challenged their governments in the name of liberty as a hero, which included Lafayette. The poem uses an image of the "ray", which is connected to Coleridge's poems on what an ideal society would be plus to the millennial views he expressed within his poem Religious Musings.

=== To Kosciusko ===
"To Kosciusko" was first published in the 16 December 1794 Morning Chronicle. Tadeusz Kościuszko led Poland in rebellion against two countries, Prussia and Russia, during the spring of 1794. When the rebellion was crushed by that October, he was captured by Russian forces and held as a prisoner. Coleridge knew few details about the specifics, which showed in alterations of the poem.

The emphasis on Kosciusko as a political prisoner that was being martyred for his beliefs connects "To Kosciusko" with "To Fayette". Coleridge discussed Kosciusko throughout his works, including a lecture series that Coleridge gave during 1795 and articles in his newspaper, Watchman. The British Romantic poets favoring of Kosciusko as a hero can be traced to Coleridge, and Leigh Hunt published his own sonnet on Kosciusko in 1815 with John Keats following with his own in 1817. They viewed Koscuisko as a figure connected to Alfred the Great, the individual that was believed to have established English constitutional liberty.

=== To Pitt ===
"To Pitt" was first published in the 23 December 1794 Morning Chronicle. The poem to Prime Minister William Pitt was reprinted with a small revision in Coleridge's magazine The Watchman on 2 April 1796 and included in Coleridge's 1796 collection of poems under the name "Effusion 3, to Mercy". This edition was soon reprinted in The Universal Magazine for the October 1796 edition. Earlier in the year, Pitt used his power to suspend Habeas Corpus in order to crack down on government opposition. This crackdown was followed by the 1794 Treason Trials, in which dissidents were charged with treason. Although Coleridge was an opponent of Pitt's at the time of writing the sonnet "To Pitt", he was to later change his mind about politics and Pitt's government.

Like "To Burke", Coleridge's "To Pitt" is one of the few poems within the Sonnets on Eminent Characters series that does not address one of his heroes. Both poems discuss the abuse of "freedom" along with the depiction of a male figure dominating a female image. Within the poem, Pitt is seen as Judas the betrayer with Britain as a feminine version of Christ. Coleridge took a political risk in the publishing of the poem. However, the political ramifications and effect the poem may have had was ephemeral as the poem may not have had the influence that Coleridge would have wanted.

=== To Bowles ===
"To Bowles" was first published in the 26 December 1794 Morning Chronicle. William Lisle Bowles had an important role in Coleridge's early poetry; he served as a poetic model for Coleridge to follow. This influence can be traced to when Coleridge was given a copy of Bowles's sonnets in 1789.

Most of the Sonnets on Eminent Characters is devoted to those Coleridge considered heroes with Bowles representing poetry. Although Coleridge praises Bowles for "soft Strains", Coleridge was to turn to flashy type of poetic model as he developed as a poet. In many of Coleridge's works, he compares Bowles with other poems, such as William Cowper. However, the sonnets as a whole discussed views on politics that Coleridge held. and Coleridge emphasizes how Bowles influenced his political beliefs. In particular, Bowles provided Coleridge with the ideas of a universal brotherhood.

=== To Mrs Siddons ===
"To Mrs Siddons" was first published in the 29 December 1794 Morning Chronicle. Sarah Siddons was an actress that Coleridge became aware of during his college years when he would travel to London to experience the theatre. Although it was originally printed as by Coleridge, it is uncertain as to who actually wrote the poem; it is possible that Charles Lamb wrote the poem, as he mentioned it as his in a June 1796 letter. Later, the 1796 collection of Coleridge's letters claimed it as Lamb's, but later collections did not attribute it to Lamb. It is possible that the poem was jointly written by Coleridge and Lamb, and the poem, if Lamb's, would represent one of his earliest works.

Of the subjects Coleridge discusses in the Sonnets on Eminent Characters series, only Siddons and Richard Brinsley Sheridan represent the theatre. The poem discusses many of Siddons's theatrical roles, including her performances in various plays by William Shakespeare. The poem also compares Coleridge's witnessing of the performances to a child hearing stories told to him. Coleridge's feelings towards Siddons continued to be favourable and he even wrote a play that he hoped she would take a part. However, that play was not produced.

=== To Godwin ===
"To William Godwin, Author of Political Justice" was first published in the 10 January 1795 Morning Chronicle. Coleridge wrote to Robert Southey and informed him that he wrote a sonnet about William Godwin, but that it was lacking. For various reasons, including both a change of view over Godwin and his concerns that the poem was flawed, Coleridge decided to not publish the poem again in his collections. Others in Coleridge's circle also had a change of view over Godwin, but they, and Coleridge, were still interacting with and helping Godwin publish works by 1800.

Like "To Bowles", "To Godwin" is a personal poem that describes the impact Godwin had over Coleridge's life. Coleridge respected Godwin's politics and his support of those put on trial during the 1794 Treason Trials, and Coleridge owed much of his political beliefs to Godwin. However, Godwin's atheism caused him concern; a dinner with Godwin and others after the composition of "To Kosciusko" led into a dispute over theology that convinced Coleridge that Godwin lacked intelligence. The poem does praise Godwin, but Coleridge continues the theological dispute that happened during their meeting by using religious rhetoric to describe Godwin, particularly in lines 9 and 10. As 1795 progressed, Coleridge supported some of the political beliefs of Godwin, but he continued to criticize his stance on religion.

=== To Robert Southey ===
"To Robert Southey, of Baliol College, Oxford, Author of the 'Retrospect,' and Other Poems" was first published in the 14 January 1795 Morning Chronicle. The poem, only published once, was dedicated to the friendship that Southey and Coleridge shared. They first met during the summer of 1794 and bonded instantly. Soon after, they developed plans to form a community in America under the idea of Pantisocracy. They both went so far as to marry a pair of sisters. When Coleridge began to try to publish his poems, he grew distant from both his wife and Southey. Soon after this time, their idea for Pantisocracy fell apart, and the change in Coleridge's opinions on Southey is reflected in Coleridge's not republishing the poems within his 1796 collection of poems.

Like the poems in the series "To Godwin" and "To Bowles", "To Southey" talks about Coleridge's personal life and Southey's involvement in it. The poem also follows the model of Milton's sonnet on Henry Lawes ("Sonnet 13") in a similar manner of "To Bowles" and "To Mrs Siddons". Like what happened with Godwin, Coleridge grew distant from Southey, which coincided with Coleridge's emphasis on Christianity as an essential component to his political beliefs. However, even within the poem, there is no direct reference to Southey's liberal political beliefs. Instead, the poem only discusses Southey as a poet.

=== To Sheridan ===
"To Richard Brinsley Sheridan, Esq." was first published in the 29 January 1795 Morning Chronicle. Richard Brinsley Sheridan was a famous comic playwright, but Coleridge emphasized the sentimental aspects of Sheridan's writing. This is what prompted Coleridge to dedicate a poem to the playwright and not to someone else. Coleridge also knew of Sheridan as a political figure; Sheridan was a witness during the 1794 Treason Trials and also argued for the repeal of the Habeas Corpus Suspension Act.

The Sonnets on Eminent Characters contained many poems dedicated to those Coleridge considered his hero and Sheridan was a representative of the theatre. Like "To Erskine", Coleridge modeled his poem off of Milton's sonnet to Henry Vane ("Sonnet 17"). Also, "To Sheridan" and "To Bowles" were the only representation of Coleridge's contemporaries from literature within his 1796 collection of poems.

=== To Lord Stanhope ===
Unlike the other sonnets in the Eminent Characters series, "To Lord Stanhope" was not published in the Morning Chronicle. The first appearance of the poem was in Coleridge's 1796 collection of poems and not in the Morning Chronicle like the original series. The poem was dedicated to Charles Stanhope, 3rd Earl Stanhope, an individual that held similar beliefs to Coleridge. Unlike his brother-in-law Prime Minister Pitt, Stanhope supported the French Revolution. However, by the time Coleridge would have had the poem printed for his 1796 collection of poems, he changed his mind on Stanhope and the poem was not to be reprinted in later collections. However, it still was printed in the 1803 collection. In a note placed in a copy of the 1803 collection, Coleridge claims that it was a mistake that the poem was printed in the first collection of poems and a problem that it was published in the 1803 edition.

Coleridge also claimed that the poem was originally to be taken ironically, but there is little evidence to support that claim as anything more than a retrospective reaction against the poem. It is possible that Coleridge wrote a poem in the 31 January 1795 Morning Chronicle addressed to Stanhope under the name "One of the People". However, attribution of the poem has been constantly argued and it cannot be definitively attributed. If the sonnet is Coleridge's, then it would show a further connection between the thoughts of Stanhope and Coleridge on a brotherhood of men, a theme that appears in the 1796 edition of the poem along with other works by Coleridge.

== Critical response ==
An anonymous review of Coleridge's 1796 collection of poems in the June 1796 Critical Review selected "To Fayette" as an example of Coleridge's poetry, stating, "The Effusions are in general very beautiful. The following will please every lover of poetry, and we give them as a specimen of the rest".

In 1901, the critic H D Traill discussed the sonnets in relation to Coleridge's other poems and claims, "The Coleridgian sonnet is not only imperfect in form and in marked contrast in the frequent bathos of its close to the steady swell and climax of Wordsworth, but, in by far the majority of the instances in this volume, it is wanting in internal weight. The 'single pebble' of thought which a sonnet should enclose is not only not neatly wrapped up in its envelope of words, but it is very often not heavy enough to carry itself and its covering to the mark."

Coleridge's 20th-century biographer Richard Holmes argues that, "These were all essentially ideological pieces, which caused a considerable stir in the city and made Coleridge's name generally known for the first time. As verse, they were clumsy and laboured, but Coleridge was aware of this". Stuart Curran claims that the series "return the sonnet to its assumption of public and polemical responsibilities, an area conspicuously identified in the British tradition with the achievement of Milton [...] Most remarkable in the series, both for its rhetoric and its political daring, is the sonnet on Prime Minister Pitt. Suddenly appearing halfway through the series [...] it recaptures accents that had not [...] been heard in this form since Milton's 'On the New Forcers of Conscience' a century and a half before; nor did even Milton, for all his intensity, stretch his metaphors to such virulence".
