= Romani studies =

Interdisciplinary ethnic studies field

Romani studies (occasionally Gypsiology) is an interdisciplinary ethnic studies field concerned with the culture, history and political experiences of the Romani people. The discipline also focuses on the interactions between other peoples and Romas, and their mindset towards the Romas.

Other terms for the academic field include Ziganology, Ciganology, Romology, Romalogy, and Romistics.

Some of the notable scholars of Romani studies includes Ian Hancock, Colin Clark Yaron Matras and Lev Cherenkov among others. Earlier writers on the subject such as Angus Fraser wrote pioneering works that influenced the field of Romani studies.

== Publications ==
Some of the dedicated publications on Romani studies are:

- Critical Romani Studies (Central European University, Hungary)
- Romani Studies (Gypsy Lore Society, United States)
- Romani studies back catalogue of the University of Hertfordshire Press.
- Romani tagged articles at Harvard University.

== General Academic ==
=== Universities with Romani Studies Departments ===
- "Critical Romani Studies". Södertörn University. Stockholm, Sweden.
- "Romani Studies Program". Central European University (CEU). Austria and Hungary.
- "Romology (Roma Studies)". University of Pécs: International Centre. Hungary.
- "The Roma Program". Harvard University:FXB Center for Health & Human Rights. Boston, MA, USA. 21 February 2018.
- "Roma studies (Romistika)". University of Zagreb (FFZG). Zagreb, Croatian.
- "Roma studies (Romistika)". Charles University. Prague, Czech Republic.

=== Conferences ===
- "Inaugural Romani Studies Conference at UC Berkeley". YouTube. - YouTube channel, recordings of the conference

== See also ==
- Names of the Romani people
- Anti-Romani sentiment
- Leeds University Libraries' Gypsy, Traveller and Roma Collections
