= Uhlik =

Uhlík (Czech/Slovak feminine: Uhlíková) is a Czech and Slovak surname. Notable people with the surname include:

- Ilona Uhlíková-Voštová (born 1954), Czech table tennis player
- Michal Uhlík (born 1980), Czech hurdler
- Rade Uhlik (1899–1991), Bosnian-Herzegovinian writer
