= Dorothy Una Ratcliffe =

British poet and Lady Mayoress of Leeds

- Born: 20 April 1887; Preston, Sussex, England
- Died: 20 November 1967 (aged 80)
- Occupation: Poet
- Writing career
- Genre: Poetry

Dorothy Una Ratcliffe (20 April 1887 – 20 November 1967), often known as D.U.R., was a socialite, heiress and author. She wrote in a Yorkshire dialect, despite being born in Sussex and brought up in Surrey. She published 49 books, edited a magazine called The Microcosm, travelled all over the world, and was a prolific collector of books, manuscripts and other documents.

== Life ==
Born 20 April 1887 in Preston, Sussex, Dorothy was the eldest of four children born to George Benson Clough, a barrister originally from Scarborough, North Yorkshire, and Rose Emily Russell, a Londoner. Dorothy had two sisters, Winifred and Pauline, and a brother Hugh. As children they were encouraged to pursue an interest in literature and produced handwritten magazines of poems, essays and illustrations. Dorothy was educated at the local grammar school before being sent to finishing schools in Germany and Paris. In Paris she studied singing and shared a teacher with Dame Nellie Melba.

=== Ratcliffe ===
In 1909, aged 22, Dorothy married Charles Frederick Ratcliffe at St Stephen's Church, Kensington having met him on a family holiday in the Isle of Wight. Charles was the nephew of the self-made wealthy tycoon Edward Allen Brotherton, later Lord Brotherton of Wakefield. Charles was heir to Brotherton, who was a widower with no children as he had lost his wife and baby in childbirth. The newly married couple moved into a home near to Brotherton's own at Roundhay Hall (now Spire Hospital) in Leeds, West Yorkshire. They would later live at Roundhay Hall themselves.

Lord Brotherton became Lord Mayor of Leeds in 1913 – 1914 and Dorothy was his Lady Mayoress. This coincided with the outbreak of the First World War and Dorothy campaigned and fund-raised alongside Lord Brotherton, encouraging men to volunteer. In 1919, Dorothy wrote a poem dedicated to the 'Mothers, Wives & Sweethearts' of the Leeds Pals, which was read aloud at a thanksgiving dinner at Leeds Town Hall.

Dorothy's marriage to Charles was not a success due to his affairs. A treatment for a venereal disease that Charles gave to Dorothy left her unable to have children. Divorce would have led to a scandal for Charles and his family so instead D.U.R focused her attentions on her social life and on helping Brotherton with his political career. Around this time, she also began to write plays, poems and character sketches. In 1930, after Brotherton became ill and died, Dorothy was finally able to divorce Charles. She did however keep the name Ratcliffe as her pen name, writing as either Dorothy Una Ratcliffe or D.U.R for the rest of her life.

=== McGrigor-Phillips ===
Finally free from her first husband, Dorothy married Noel McGrigor-Phillips in 1932. In the early years of their marriage they travelled extensively throughout the world, until war broke out in 1939. Back in the UK they purchased and renovated Acorn Bank near the Lake District, renaming it Temple Sowerby Manor.

Dorothy and Noel were married for 11 years until his sudden death in 1943. The couple were campaigning in Scotland during the Second World War to raise money for Greece when he was taken ill with a kidney complaint and never recovered.

=== Phillips ===
In 1947 Dorothy married Alfred Charles Vowles, a successful photographer and journalist. Alfred was a long-term friend of Dorothy's having met her in the hills near Kirkby Malzeard in the 1920s while she was still married to Charles Ratcliffe. On marrying Dorothy, Alfred changed his name from Vowles to Phillips. They lived together at Temple Sowerby Manor until 1950 when it was donated to the National Trust.

After donating Temple Sowerby Manor to the National Trust, Dorothy and Alfred moved to Edinburgh where they lived at 42 Ann Street. After Alfred's death in 1964 she moved to an apartment in North Berwick where she lived out the rest of her life. She continued to write until suffering a major stroke aged 80, leaving her first novel unfinished. Three months later she suffered another stroke and died. Dorothy died on 20 November 1967.

== Writing and themes ==
During her lifetime Dorothy was described as a writer with "genuine not-to-be-questioned folk-feeling and instinct for folk-rhythms".

She had a deep love for the Yorkshire Dales and its dialects and customs. She published her first volume of Dales ballads, The Dales of Arcady, in 1918 and produced many subsequent volumes, poems and plays over the following years. She also had a passion for Gypsy and Traveller culture which provided another subject for her writing. She published 49 books in her lifetime, was a regular contributor to The Dalesman and the Yorkshire Post and edited the literary magazine The Microcosm to which G. K. Chesterton and J. R. R. Tolkien were contributors. She was also an active campaigner for the Yorkshire Dialect and Gypsy Lore societies.

Many of her books were illustrated by Wensleydale artist Fred Lawson who shared D.U.R's love of the Yorkshire countryside and its people. Some of her work was also illustrated by Cecile Walton.

D.U.R counted writer Philip Larkin and painter Augustus John amongst her acquaintances.

== 'Gypsy library' and other collections ==
While married to Charles Ratcliffe, Dorothy had encouraged and assisted Lord Brotherton in his collecting of early books and manuscripts, which would eventually become the Brotherton Collection.

Dorothy's own most notable collection is her library of books, documents and news cuttings about Romany life and culture. Originally housed at Temple Sowerby Manor they were donated to the Brotherton Library at the University of Leeds in 1950. Her donation of what she called her ‘Gypsy library’ formed the start of the university's Romany Collection and also included manuscripts and artwork. It is part of Leeds University Library's Gypsy, Traveller and Roma Collections. D.U.R was already a patron and Honorary Consultant of the Brotherton Library and in 1954 she donated money for the continued development of the collection. Her library reflects an outsider's interest and passion for Gypsy and Traveller culture. Dorothy was a vocal ally of Travelling communities, writing poems in support of their rights, publishing letters in local newspapers and writing to the National Council for Civil Liberties.

D.U.R was also a keen collector of art, furniture and ceramics. On her death in 1967 her collection of art, glass and fans was bequeathed to the City of Leeds.

== Legacy ==
The National Trust's Dorothy Una Ratcliffe Fellowship supports artists-in-residence schemes at its properties.

== Selected works ==
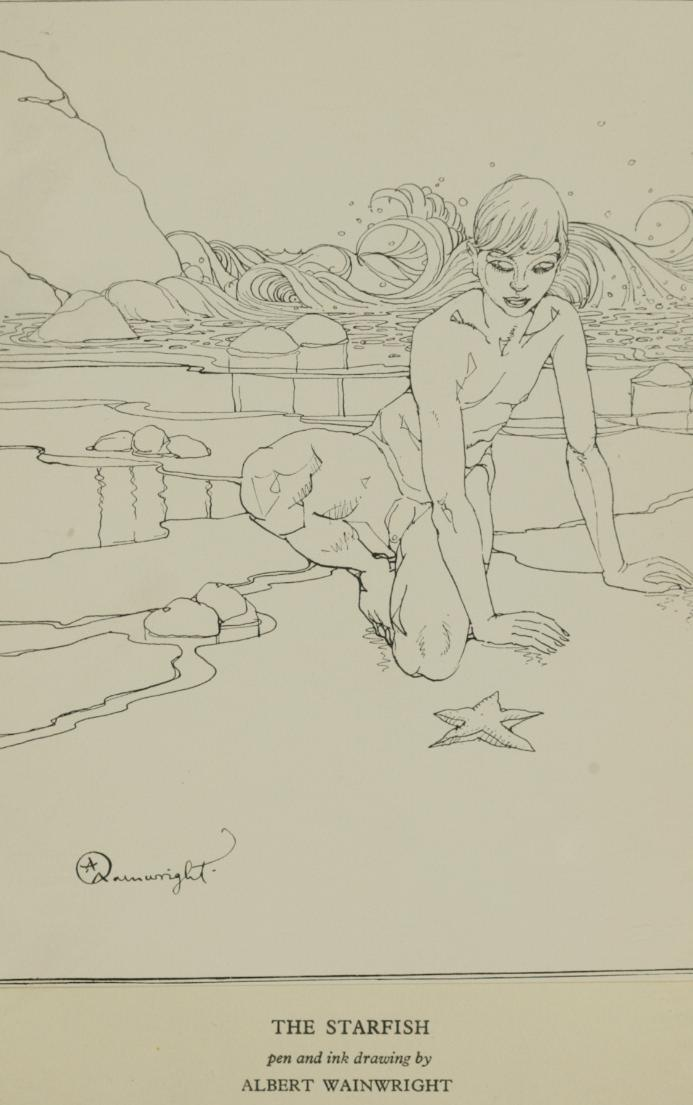
Seamicrocosm boy illustration by Albert Wainwright for DUR's publication

- Ratcliffe, Dorothy Una (1918). The Dales of Arcady. Erskine Macdonald.
- Ratcliffe, Dorothy (1924). The Book of the Microcosm. North Country Press.
- Ratcliffe, Dorothy Una (1926). The Shoeing of Jerry-Go-Nimble & Other Dialect Poems. John Lane.
- Ratcliffe, Dorothy (1927). Dale Folk. The Bodley Head.
- Ratcliffe, Dorothy (1928). To the Blue Canadian Hills. North Country Press.
- Ratcliffe, Dorothy Una (1928). Fairings. The Bodley Head.
- Ratcliffe, Dorothy Una (1929). Nightlights. John Lane.
- Ratcliffe, Dorothy (1929). The Sea Microcosm. The Microcosm Office.
- Ratcliffe, Dorothy Una (1930). The Gone Away. The Bodley Head.
- Ratcliffe, Dorothy (1933). South African Summer. Country Life.
- Ratcliffe, Dorothy (1934). Lapwings & Lavercocks. Country Life.
- Ratcliffe, Dorothy (1936). Equatorial Dawn. Eyre & Spottiswoode.
- Ratcliffe, Dorothy (1942). Mrs Buffey in Wartime. Thomas Nelson & Sons.
- Ratcliffe, Dorothy (1945). Delightsome Land. Eyre & Spottiswoode.
- Ratcliffe, Dorothy (1946). Under T'Hawthorn. Fredrick Muller.
- Ratcliffe, Dorothy Una (1947). The Daystar. Temple Sowerby Press.
- Ratcliffe, Dorothy Una (1947). Island of Little Years. Frederick Muller.
- Ratcliffe, Dorothy (1952). Up Dale. T Nelson.
- Ratcliffe, Dorothy Una (1954). Jingling Lane. Lund Humphries & Co.
- Ratcliffe, Dorothy (1960). Yorkshire Lyrics. Yorkshire Dialect Society.
- Ratcliffe, Dorothy Una (1961). The Cranesbill Caravan. Dalesman.
- Ratcliffe, Dorothy (1966). Hazelthwaite Hall. Yorkshire Dialect Society.
