= Introduction (Blake, 1794) =

1794 poem by William Blake

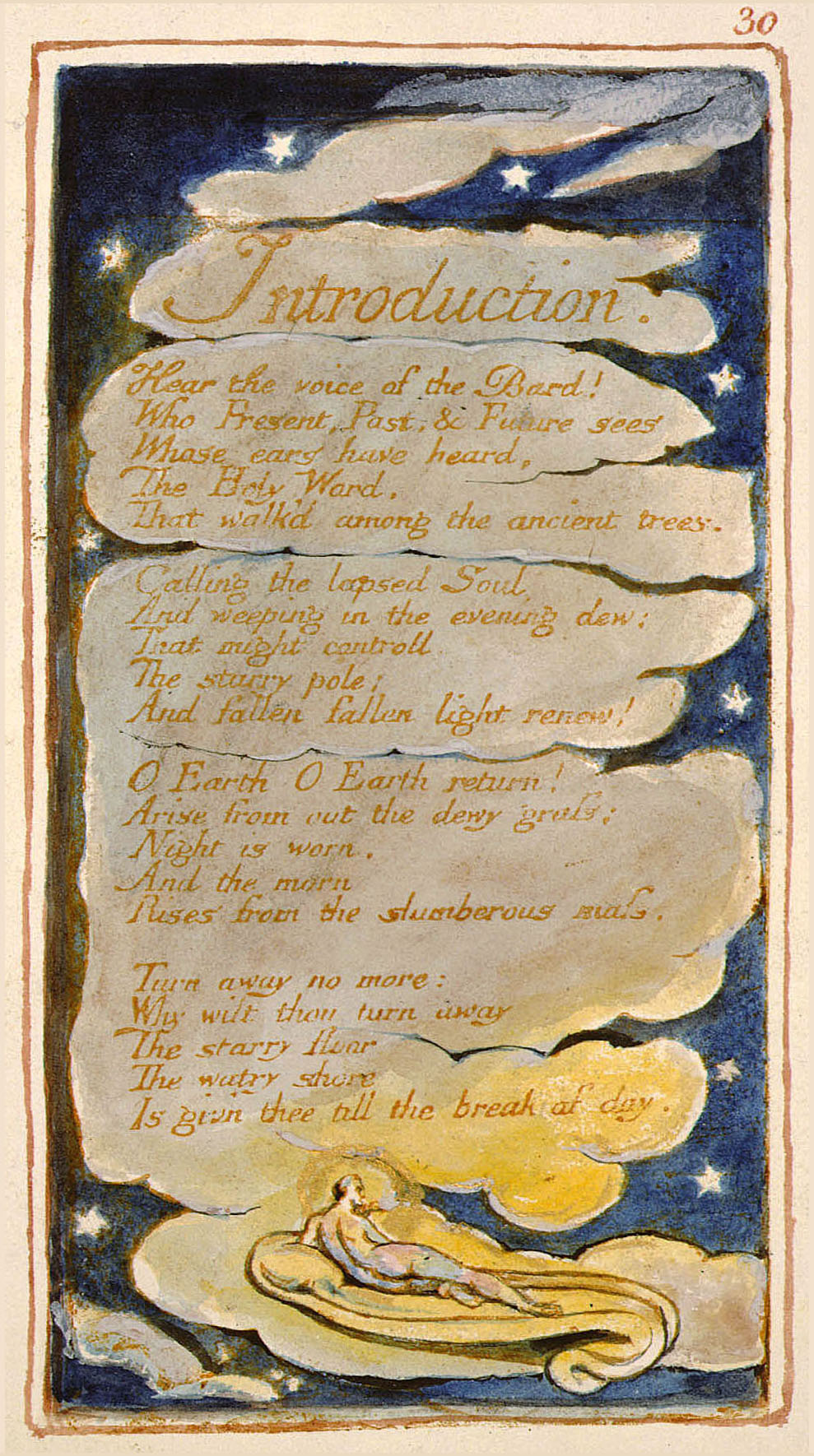
Songs of Innocence and of Experience, copy AA, 1826, object 30 (Bentley 30, Erdman 30, Keynes 30) "Introduction" (The Fitzwilliam Museum)

"Introduction" to the Songs of Experience is a poem written by the English poet William Blake. It was etched and published as part of his collection Songs of Innocence and of Experience in 1794.

== Poem ==
Hear the voice of the Bard!
Who Present, Past, & Future sees
Whose ears have heard,
The Holy Word,
That walk’d among the ancient trees.

Calling the lapsed Soul
And weeping in the evening dew:
That might controll
The starry pole:
And fallen fallen light renew!

O Earth O Earth return!
Arise from out the dewy grass;
Night is worn,
And the morn
Rises from the slumberous mass.

Turn away no more:
Why wilt thou turn away
The starry floor
The watry shore
Is giv’n thee till the break of day.

== Context and interpretation ==
The poem is etched on a single plate and placed immediately after the title-page of the Songs of Experience. The text has not been found in any draft or manuscript version. Its subject is closely connected with the poem The Voice of the Ancient Bard in the Songs of Innocence. "The Voice of the Ancient Bard" immediately precedes the Introduction to "Songs of Experience" in some copies of the Songs, and Earth's Answer follows in all copies. In the poem, Blake's narratorial voice acts as the Ancient Bard and the Prophet, who hears Jehovah speaking to Adam in the Garden of Eden.

Geoffrey Keynes says that Blake, as the prophet "calls the Fallen Man to regain control of the world, lost when he adopted Reason (the 'starry pole') in place of Imagination.” Earth symbolizes the Fallen Man within the poem. Blake ('the voice of the Bard') calls him to awake from the evil darkness and return to the realm of Imagination, reassuming the light of its previous 'prelapsarian' state. Reason (the 'starry pole') and the Sea of Time and Spece (the 'watr'ry shore') "are there only till the break of day if Earth would consent to leave 'the slumberous mass'".

The illustration shows a big cloud in a night sky and scattered stars. The text is placed on the cloud. There is a nude female with long hair and a halo above her head, reclining on a couch on a cloud below the text. This is probably the image of Earth addressed by "the voice of the Bard".

Coleridge marked the poem with the symbol “H” that meant “still greater” than just “gave me pleasure”. Anonymous Blake's contemporary reviewer (C. A. Tulk? 1830) wrote:

Around these lines the stars are rolling their resplended orbs, and in the cloud on which the song floats, a human form is lying, anxiously surveying their courses: these are a few wild notes struck forth be the hand of a master.

Robert F. Gleckner in his review (1957) notices that Blake hints at the correct reading by means of the ambiguity of the first two stanzas, introducing actually two voices in the poem, the Bard's and the Holy Word's, “calling the lapsed Soul” (line 6).

“The last two stanzas are the words of both voices, perfectly in context when the dual purpose of the poem recognized."

This dual purpose of the poem is to introduce to the state and the songs of experience, “in which the Holy Word of Jehovah is hypocritical, selfish, and jealous, thinking and acting in terms of the physical phenomena of day and night and the earthly morality of rewarding and punishment”, and the same time the Bard being mortal is prophetically imaginative, who “thinks and acts by eternal time and according to eternal values.”

Kathleen Raine in her Blake's Debt to Antiquity (1963) speaks about Blake's idea that “souls who enter the created world from beyond the galaxy become subject to the demiurge”. She says that “Blake reminds the fallen soul that she herself comes from eternity, and ‘might control / The starry pole / And fallen, fallen light renew.’ But in this world she is subject to ‘Starry Jealousy’, who, like the Hermetic demiurge, ‘containing the Circles and Whirling them about, turned round as a Wheel his own Workmanships, and suffered them to be turned from an indefinite Beginning to an undeterminable End’.” Here Raine cited the Divine Poemander attributed to Hermes Trismegistus in the Corpus Hermeticum that looks like a quotation from Blake himself.

== Musical settings ==
- Jean Coulthard (1908–2000): First Song of Experience, for alto voice and piano, 1968.
- John Edmunds (1913–1986): Hear the voice of bard, for high voice and piano, 1938 (in Hesperides: 50 songs by John Edmunds)
- David Farquhar (1928–2007): Hear the voice of bard, No. 10 from Blake Songs, for voice and piano, 1947-49
- Hayg Boyadjian (b. 1938): Hear the voice of bard. No. 3 from Song Cycle on Poems of William Blake, for soprano, flute, clarinet, percussion, piano, violin, cello, and bass, 1978
- John Harbison (b. 1938): Introduction (Hear the voice of bard), No. 1 from Five Songs of Experience, for 4 soli, SATB chorus, string quartet and percussions, 1971
- Gary Higginson (b. 1952): Introduction (Hear the voice of bard), No. 1 from Seven Songs of Experience (set no. 2), for SATB, 1981-2
- David Haines (b.1956): Introduction (Hear the voice of bard), No. 1 from Songs of Experience, for high voice and piano, 1972–79, rev. 1984
- U2: Beautiful Ghost, from The Joshua Tree, Deluxe Edition, 2007 20th anniversary re-issue

The Joshua Tree#20th anniversary remastered edition The list also includes works by: Joseph Charles Holbrooke, UK; Daniel Jenkyn Jones, UK; Kelsey Jones, Canada; Sharon E. Kanach, USA; Joan Anne Littlejohn, UK; Otto Luening, USA; David Lumsdaine, Australia/UK; Frank Mitchell (John Franklin Mitchell), USA; Gordon Myers, USA, Sarah l. Rogers, UK, Sven-David Sandström, Sweden; Paul Schwartz (1907–1999), USA/Austria; Elie Siegmeister, USA; and Leo Smith (1881–1952), Canada.

== Gallery ==
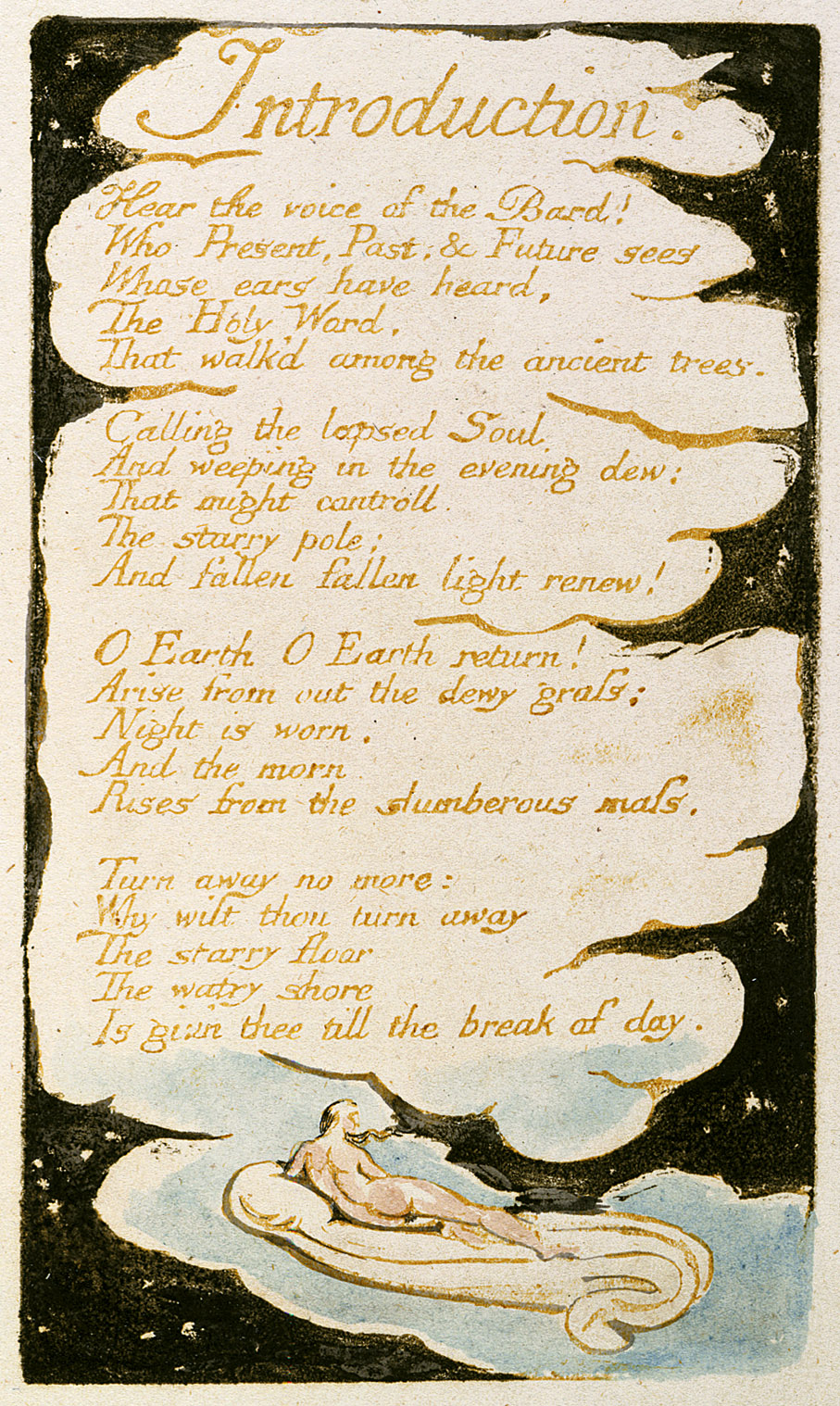
Introduction (SE) copy B, 1789, 1794 (British Museum)

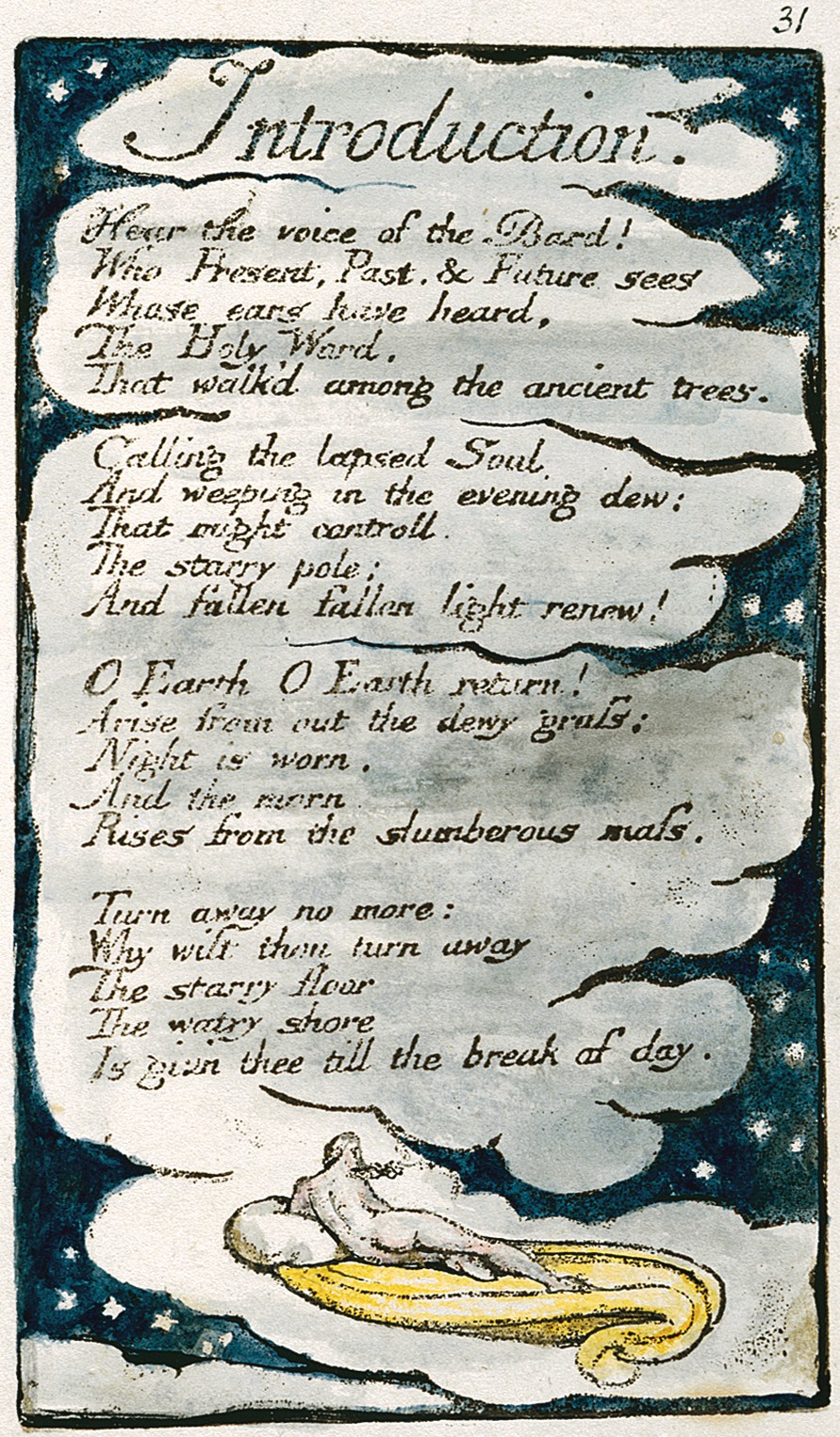
Introduction (SE) copy L, 1795 (Yale Center for British Art)

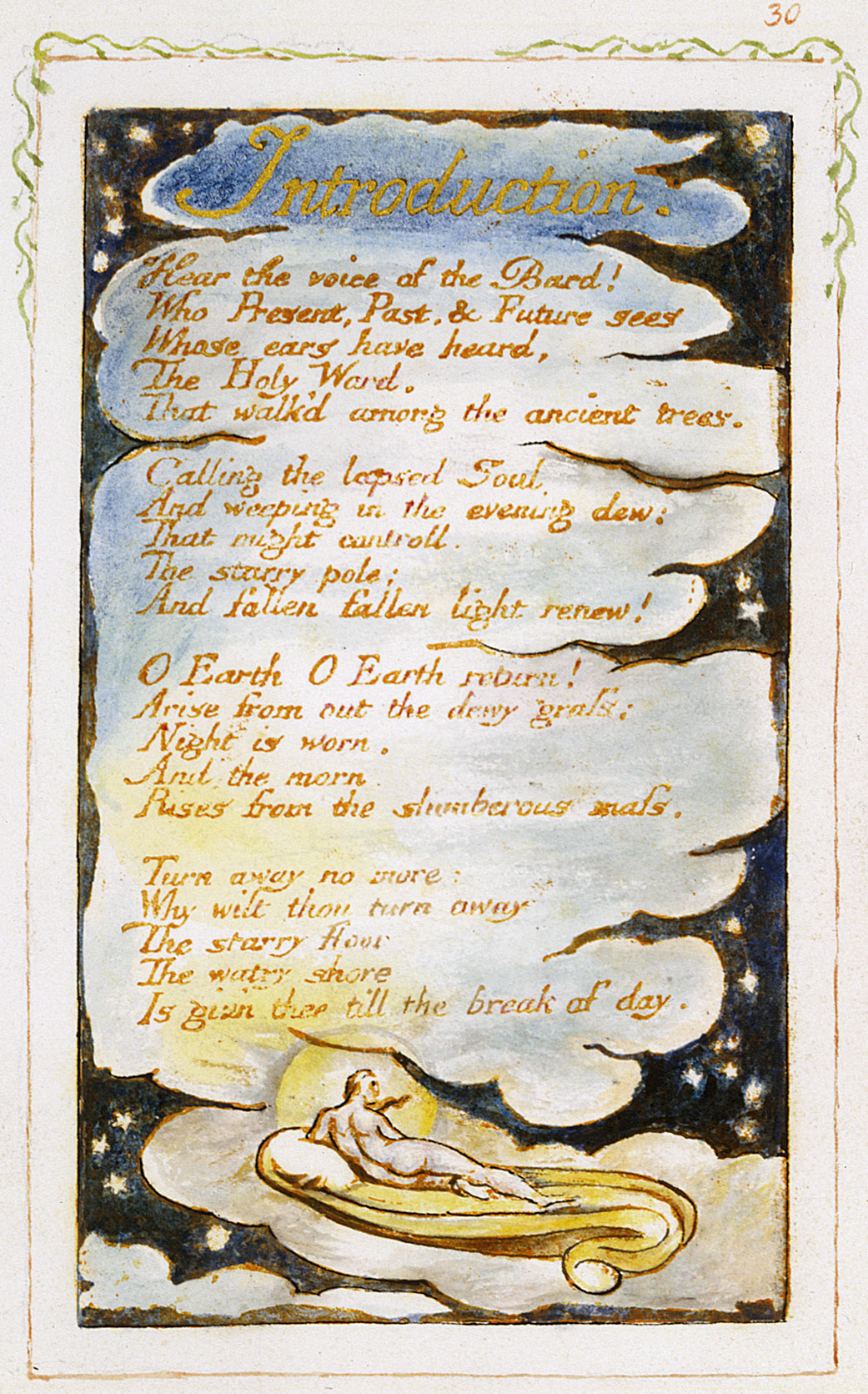
Introduction (SE) copy Y, 1825 (Metropolitan Museum of Art)

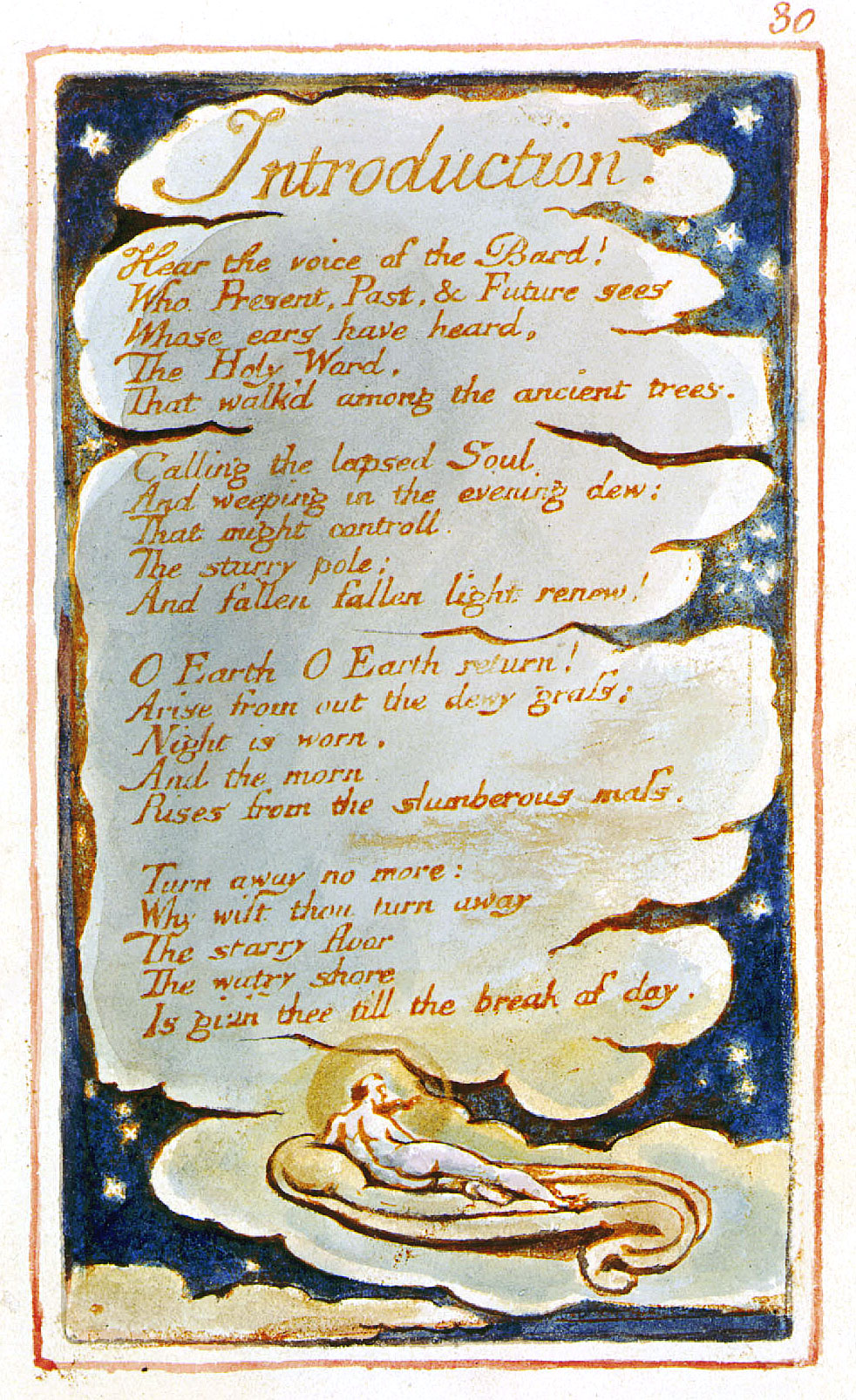
Introduction (SE) copy Z, 1826 (Library of Congress)

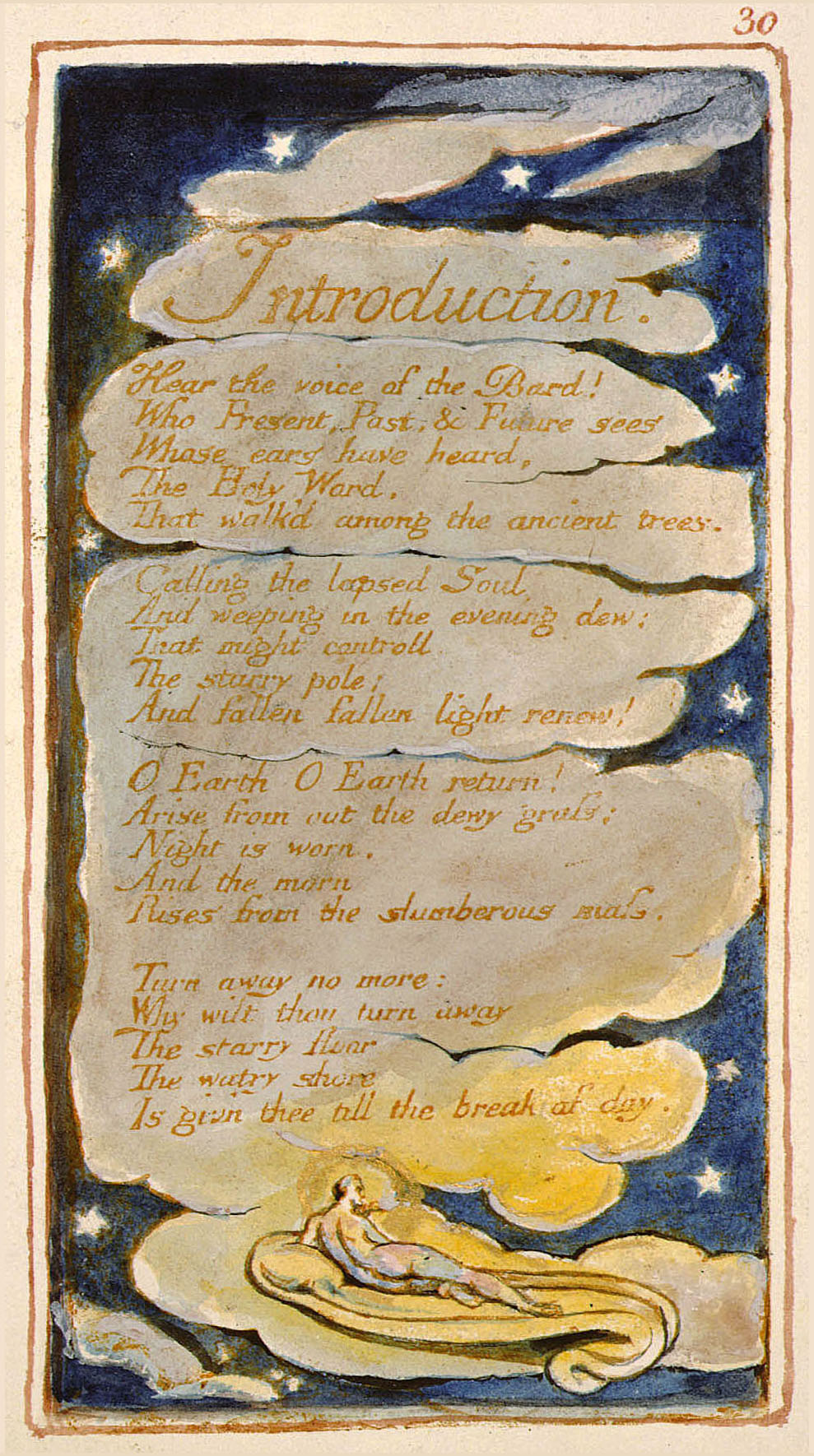
Introduction (SE) copy AA, 1826 (The Fitzwilliam Museum)

== Notes ==
=== Works cited ===
- John Sampson (ed.). The poetical works of William Blake; a new and verbatim text from the manuscript engraved and letterpress originals; With variorum readings and bibliographical notes and prefaces. Clarendon Press Oxford 1905. p. 134.
- Blake Songs of Innocence and of Experience, with an Introduction and Commentary by Geoffrey Keynes. Oxford University Press. 1967. ISBN 978-0192810892.
- Robert F. Gleckner. Point of View and Context in Blake's Songs. New York Public Library Bulletin 61(11), November 1957, 534-35.
- Fitch, Donald (1990). Blake set to music - a bibliography of musical settings of the poems and prose of William Blake. Berkeley, Los Angeles and Oxford: University of California Press. ISBN 978-0520097346.
