= Rade Uhlik =

Bosnian-Herzegovinian romologist

- Born: Aladar Uhlik; February 1, 1899; Sarajevo, Bosnia vilayet, Ottoman Empire
- Died: June 12, 1991 (aged 92); Sarajevo, SR Bosnia and Herzegovina, SFRY
- Occupation(s): Romology, curator, writer

Rade Uhlik (February 1, 1899 - June 12, 1991), Bosnian-Herzegovinian romologist, linguist, academic and writer.

== Biography ==
Rade Uhlik was born in Sarajevo, Bosnia, in 1899. His name was Aladar, but he later changed it to Rade. He spent his youth in Vienna, Pesta and Belgrade, where he studied German. Returning to Bosnia, he taught German at high schools in Prijedor, Tuzla and Sarajevo. After the Second World War, as a polyglot, who spoke 14 languages, he got a job as a translator at Tanjug. For some time, he worked as a curator at the National Museum of Bosnia and Herzegovina. His scientific activity is primarily related to the collection of Romani oral tradition, to the description of Romani culture and various dialects of the Romani language in the Balkans. He introduced the term Gurbeti for the group of Roma who inhabited the Western and Central Balkans. Their linguistic peculiarities he classified into four groups of gurbet. He researched primarily the speeches of Bosnian Gurbet, but also others, and those of Arli, Burgijaš, Gopt, etc. He also collected a rich material of Roma poetry, stories and jokes. He published a collection of Romani poems in the original Romana gilja in 1937, then translated Gypsy Poetry (1957) and Gypsy Stories (1957). He created three Romani dictionaries: Dictionary of Bosnian-Romani (Bosnian Romani Vocabulary, 1942–43), Serbo-Croatian-Gypsy Dictionary (Romane alava, 1947) and Serbo-Croatian-Romani-English Dictionary (Romengo alavari, 1983). In a number of published scientific papers, he left valuable records about the originally Croatian Roma community Gopta. Much of his manuscript legacy was destroyed during the 1992 war, and some works are kept in the Library of the Department of Indology at the Faculty of Philosophy in Zagreb.

He collaborated with international research centers dealing with the study of the Balkans and Roma issues, such as the Gypsy Lore Society in Liverpool.

Uhlik was a member of the Academy of Sciences and Arts of Bosnia and Herzegovina. He was an expert consultant in Aleksandar Petrović's film I Even Met Happy Gypsies.

== Works ==
Uhlik's literary opus is extensive and diverse. His most notable works are:

- Romane gilja (Romske pjesme) (Prijedor, 1937.)
- Bosnian Roman Vocubulary (Liverpool, 1943.)
- Srpskohrvatsko-ciganski rečnik (Romane alava) (Sarajevo, 1947.)
- Prepozitivni i postpozitivni član u gurbetskom (Sarajevo, 1951.)
- Ciganizmi u šatrovačkom argou i u sličnim govorima (Sarajevo, 1954.)
- Ciganske priče (1957.)
- Kategorija imperativa u romskom jeziku (Sarajevo, 1974.)
- Zigeunerlieder (Leipzig, 1977.)
- Ciganska poezija (R. Uhlik, Branko V. Radičević) (Beograd, 1982.)
- Srpskohrvatsko-romsko-engleski rečnik (Romengo alavari) (Sarajevo, 1983.)
- Jezik i kultura Roma (Sarajevo, 1989.)
- Romske priče" (Rromane paramiča) (Sarajevo, 2021.)
