= Elena Marushiakova =

- Елена Марушиакова
- Born: Saratov, USSR
- Citizenship: Bulgarian
- Education: Ph.D. (1986): Comenius University (Bratislava, Slovakia). M.A. History and Ethnography (1980): Sofia University St. Kliment Ohridski (Bulgaria).
- Occupations: Historian and ethnographer specializing in Romani Studies

Elena Marushiakova (Bulgarian: Елена Марушиакова) is a historian and ethnographer of Slovak and Russian origin whose research focuses on Romani Studies. She has lived and studied in both Slovakia and Bulgaria. In 2016, she became a research professor in the School of History at the University of St Andrews. Elena Marushiakova later became the president of the Gypsy Lore Society.

== Life ==
Since September 2016, Elena Marushiakova has been the Principal Investigator of an ERC Advanced Grant and works as a research professor in the School of History at the University of St Andrews.

From 2023, she has been working at the Institute of Ethnology and Social Anthropology at the Slovak Academy of Sciences.

Marushiakova was the president of the Gypsy Lore Society (2010–2020) and a Funding and Scientific Committee member of the European Academic Network on Romani Studies. From 2020 to 2022, she was co-editor-in-chief of Romani Studies (journal). Marushakova is also the founder and editor-in-chief of the Brill & Schöning Series "Roma History and Culture".

Marushiakova received, on 7 February 2020, the Doctor Honoris Causa Award of Södertörn University in Stockholm for her great contribution to Romani Studies. The appointment was challenged by academics working in Romani Studies at Södertörn, who considered her work anti-Romani and criticised her contributions to the German school of "tsiganologie". This was disclosed by the Romani-Swedish magazine DIKKO in 2021. Numerous Roma and many scholars from different countries refuted the accusations and expressed their strong support for Marushiakova. In 2022, the Initiative Group for Roma Culture, which includes Roma intellectuals from Bulgaria, honoured Marushiakova and Veselin Popov with the award "Romanipe" for their lifelong activity in the field of Roma studies.

in 2022, in recognition of Marushiakova's scholarly contribution, the Best Historical Materials Committee of the Reference and User Services Association (American Library Association) selected her co-edited volume Roma Voices in History (2021) as one of the best historical materials published in 2020–2021.

In 2024, Marushiakova received the Personality of Science and Technology award from the Ministry of Education, Research, Development, and Youth of the Slovak Republic. In 2025, she and Vesselin Popov received the Slovak Academy of Sciences Prize for Scientific Research Excellence for their remarkable publication Stalin vs. Gypsies – Roma and Political Repressions in the USSR.

In 2025, the International Committee of the Gypsy Lore Society, as part of its annual conference, awarded the Best Book in Romani Studies prize to authors Elena Marushiakova and Vesselin Popov for their book Stalin vs. Gypsies: Roma and Political Repressions in the USSR.

== Bibliography ==
=== Books ===
- Марушиакова, Елена & Веселин Попов. 2025. Първите. Гражданска еманципация на циганите/ромите в България (до края на Втората световна война). София – Братислава: Парадигма.
- Marushiakova, Elena and Vesselin Popov. 2024. Stalin vs Gypsies: Roma and Political Repressions in the USSR. Paderborn: Brill &. Ferdinand Schöningh.
- Marushiakova, Elena and Vesselin Popov, eds. 2022. Roma Portraits in History. Roma Civic Emancipation Elite in Central, South-Eastern and Eastern Europe from the 19th Century until World War II. Leiden: Brill & Paderborn: Schöningh.
- Marushiakova, Elena and Vesselin Popov, eds. 2021. Roma Voices in History: A Source Book. Roma Civic Emancipation in Central, South-Eastern and Eastern Europe from 19th Century until the Second World War. Leiden: Brill & Paderborn: Schöningh.
- Marushiakova, Elena and Vesselin Popov. 2016. Gypsies of Central Asia and Caucasus. London: Palgrave Macmillan.
- Marushiakova, Elena and Vesselin Popov. 2007. Студии Романи. Vol. VII. Избрано. София: Парадигма.
- Marushiakova, Elena, Udo Mischek, Vesselin Popov and Bernhard Streck. 2005. Dienstleistungsnomadismus am Schwarzen Meer. Zigeunergruppen zwischen Symbiose und Dissidenz. Orientwissenschaftliche Hefte (16).
- Marushiakova, Elena and Vesselin Popov. 2001. Gypsies in the Ottoman Empire. Hatfield: University of Hertfordshire Press. [1st ed.: Циганите в Османската империя. София: Литавра.] [Translations: Marushiakova, Elena and Vesselin Popov. 2003. Romi u Turskom Carstvu. Subotica: Čikoš Holding; Marushiakova, Elena and Vesselin Popov. 2006. Osmanlı Imperatorluğu'nda Çingeneler. Istanbul: Homer;یلینا ماروشیاکوف٢٠٠٩ ا و فاسلین بو. تاریخ الغج. الغجر فی الدولة العثما نیة. وکالةسفنکس (Egypt, 2009)]
- Marushiakova, Elena and Vesselin Popov. 1997. Gypsies (Roma) in Bulgaria. Frankfurt am Main: Peter Lang. [1st ed.: 1993. Циганите в България. София: Клуб 1990.]

=== Collections of folklore and oral history ===
- Marushiakova, Elena, Vesselin Popov and Birgit Igla, eds. 1998. Studii Romani. Vol. V-VI. The Snake's Ring. The Language and Folklore of Erli from Sofia. // Студии Романи. Том V-VI. Змийският пръстен. Език и фолклор на Софийските Ерлии. Sofia: Litavra. [bilingual edititon]
- Marushiakova, Elena and Vesselin Popov, eds. 1997. Studii Romani. Vol. III-IV. The Song of the Bridge. // Студии Романи. Том III-IV. Песента за моста. Sofia: Litavra. [bilingual edititon]
- Marushiakova, Elena and Vesselin Popov, eds. 1995. Studii Romani. Vol. II. // Студии Романи. Том II. Sofia: Club '90. [bilingual edititon]
- Marushiakova, Elena and Vesselin Popov, eds. 1994. Studii Romani. Vol. I. // Студии Романи. Том I. Sofia: Club '90. [bilingual edititon]

=== University textbooks ===
- Марушиакова, Елена и Веселин Попов. 2012. Циганите в Източна Европа. Курс Лекции. София: Парадигма.
- Кючуков, Христо, Елена Марушиакова и Веселин Попов. 2004. Христоматия по ромска култура. София: Иктус Принт.

=== Illustrated books and catalogues ===
- Marushiakova, Elena and Vesselin Popov. 2012. Roma Culture in Past and Present. Catalogue. Sofia: Paradigma. [Translations: Марушиакова, Елена и Веселин Попов. 2012. Ромската етнокултура – минало и настояще. Каталог. София: Парадигма; Marushiakova, Elena and Vesselin Popov. 2012. I Romani etnokultura – paluptnipe thaj akana. Katalogo. Sofia: Paradigma; Marushiakova, Elena and Vesselin Popov. 2012. La cultura étnica de los Gitanos (Roma) – pasado y presente. Catálogo. Sofia: Paradigma.]
- Marushiakova, Elena, Udo Mischek, Vesselin Popov and Bernhard Streck. 2008. Zigeuner am Schwarzen Meer. Leipzig: Eudora Verlag.
- Marushiakova, Elena and Vesselin Popov. 2000. Gypsies Roma in Times Past and Present. Photo-Book. // Цигани/Рома от старо и ново време. Фото-книга. Sofia: Litavra. [bilingual edititon]
- Marushiakova, Elena and Vesselin Popov. 1995. The Gypsies of Bulgaria. Problems of the multicultural museum exhibition. // Циганите на България. Проблеми на мултикултуралната музейна експозиция. Sofia: Club '90. [bilingual edititon]

=== Assessment studies ===
- Guy, Will, Andre Liebich and Elena Marushiakova. 2010. Improving the tools for the social inclusion and non-discrimination of Roma in the EU. Report. Luxembourg: Publications Office of the European Union.
- Marushiakova, Elena et al. 2001. Identity Formation among Minorities in the Balkans: The Cases of Roms, Egyptians and Ashkali in Kosovo. Sofia: Minority Studies Society "Studii Romani".

=== Edited volumes ===
- Pashov, Shakir M. 2023. History of the Gypsies in Bulgaria and Europe: Roma. Marushiakova, Elena, Vesselin Popov & Lilyana Kovacheva, eds. Paderborn: Brill & Ferdinand Schöningh.
- Пашов, Шакир. 2023. История на циганите в България и Европа: Рома. Марушиакова, Елена, Веселин Попов & Лиляна Ковачева (Съст.). София: Парадигма.
- Черных, Александр В., Елена А. Марушиаковой & Надежда Г. Деметер, eds. 2022. Цыганские сообщества в социуме: адаптация, интеграция, взаимодействия. Санкт-Петербург: Мамонтов.
- Marushiakova, Elena and Vesselin Popov, eds. 2020. Gypsy Policy and Roma Activism: From the Interwar Period to Current Policies and Challenges. Social Inclusion. Vol. 8, No. 2.
- Kyuchukov, Hristo, Elena Marushiakova and Vesselin Popov, eds. 2020. Preserving the Romani Memories. Festschrift in Honor of Dr. Adam Bartosz. München: Lincom Academic Publishers.
- Kyuchukov, Hristo, Elena Marushiakova and Vesselin Popov, eds. 2016. Roma: Past, Present, Future. München: Lincom Academic Publishers.
- Marushiakova, Elena and Vesselin Popov, eds. 2016. Roma Culture: Myths and Realities. München: Lincom Academic Publishers.
- Marushiakova, Elena, ed. 2008. Dynamics of National Identity and Transnational Identities in the Process of European Integration. Newcastle: Cambridge Scholars Publishing.
