= Dora Yates =

Bibliographer and Romani scholar

- Born: 26 November 1879; Liverpool, Lancashire, England
- Died: 12 January 1974 (aged 94); Wavertree, Liverpool, England

Dora Esther Yates (26 November 1879 – 12 January 1974) was a British bibliographer, linguist and Romani scholar. She understood every dialect of Romani and she became the de facto secretary of the Gypsy Lore Society in 1922.

== Life ==
Yates was born in Liverpool in 1879. She was one of eight children born to Hannah (born Keyser) and George Samuel Yates. She taught herself to read and write both English and Hebrew before the age of five and when she was sixteen she was at university. She had a successful time at university and in her spare time she studied the travel writer and Romani expert G. H. Borrow. She was on the committee of the women's debating and athletic societies and when she graduated in 1899 she had a first class honours degree in English, Latin, German, and Anglo-Saxon. A year later she showed her knowledge of Gothic, Anglo-Saxon and Middle English by becoming the first Jewish woman to gain a master's degree in England. She was fluent in French and German and every major dialect of Romani.

In 1906, she returned to Liverpool University to be a tutor in English literature. She would serve the university for the next thirty-nine years.

The Gypsy Lore Society had ceased to function during World War I. John Sampson was its president as of 1915. Yates supported the society's revival in 1922 and she became its de facto secretary, although this did not happen formally until 1932.

When Sampson was creating The Dialect of the Gypsies of Wales she was his main assistant. She resisted his sexual advances but found him intriguing. She spent years recording the stories and dialect of the Wood family of Welsh Gypsies as a basis for Sampson's book. Other Sampson followers were Gladys Imlach, Eileen Lyster and Agnes Marston. Yates and Agnes Marston were sent in 1907 to find the burial place of Abram Wood ("The King of the Gypsies"), which they did, at Llangelynnin; Lyster later confirmed it, with a 1799 register entry. Yates and Marston were also successful in tracking down Matthew Wood, Sampson's important Welsh Romani source who had then been out of contact for nine years, at Betws Gwerfil Goch in 1908.

The Dialect of the Gypsies of Wales was first published in 1926 after thirty years of work.

When Sampson died in 1931, Yates became the keeper of his literary estate. Yates organised Sampson's funeral and at his wife's request, women (other than Yates) were excluded.

In 1945, she completed nearly forty years employment at Liverpool University, and she was appointed curator of the Scott Macfie Gypsy Collection. In 1948 she published a collection of Gypsy folk tales, and in 1953 she published My Gypsy Days; Recollections of Romani Rawni.

In 1963, her university recognised her achievement and awarded her a doctorate. The gypsies of northern England had already given her the affectionate name of "Rawnie Dorelia".

Yates was an Orthodox Jew who saw the gypsies as the only "free race". She was an active officer of the Gypsy Lore Society in her nineties. A taxi would take her each day to her university office where she would deal with letters in several languages including Romani. She died in Wavertree in 1974, at the age of 94.
