= The Voice of the Ancient Bard =

1789 poem by William Blake

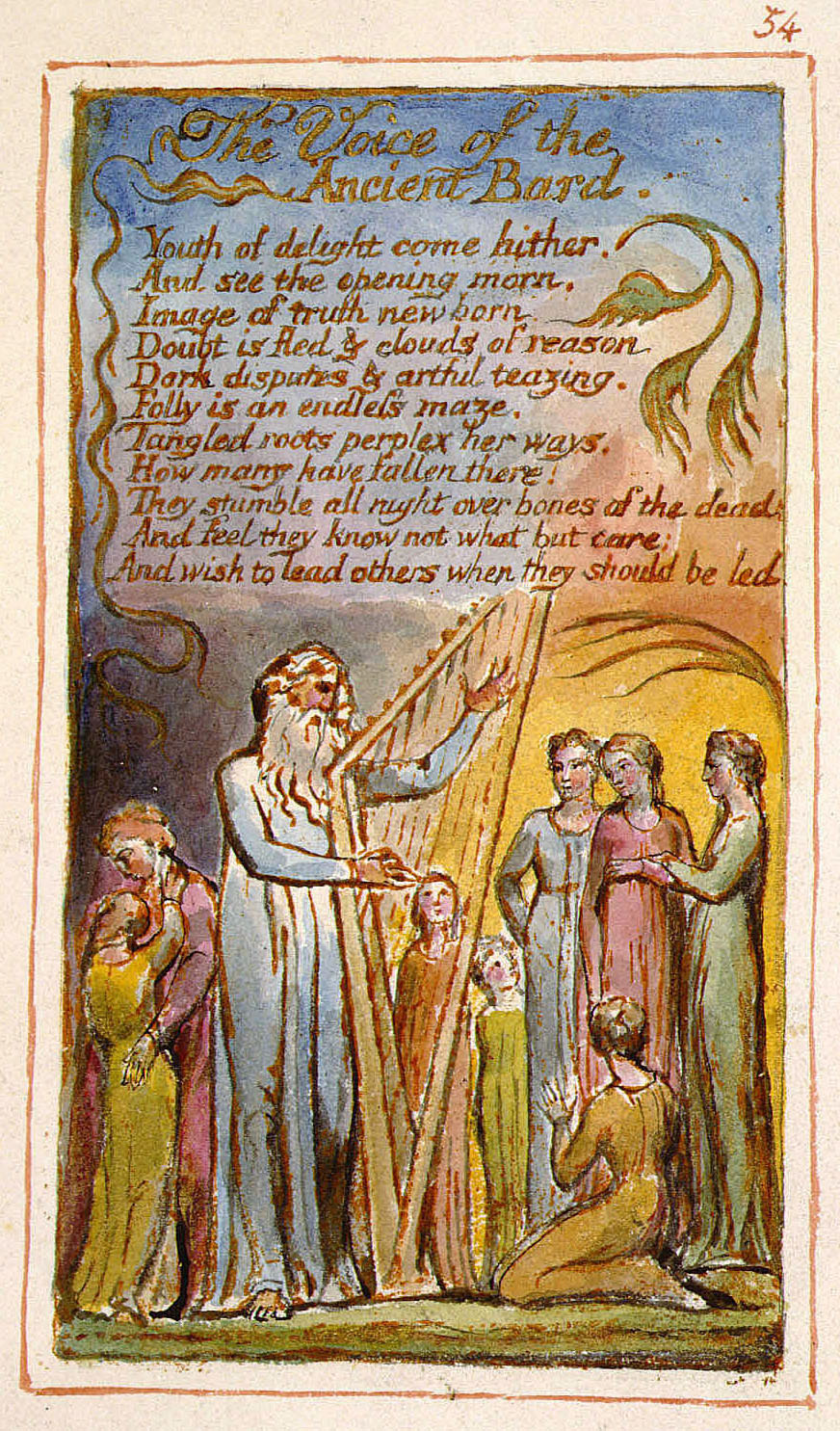
Songs of Innocence and of Experience, copy AA, 1826, object 54 (Bentley 54, Erdman 54, Keynes 54) "Introduction" (The Fitzwilliam Museum)

"The Voice of the Ancient Bard" is a poem written by the English poet William Blake. It was published as part of his collection Songs of Innocence in 1789, but later moved to Songs of Experience, the second part of the larger collection Songs of Innocence and of Experience, 1794.

== Poem ==
The following is a transcription of the poem:

Youth of delight come hither.
And see the opening morn,
Image of truth new born.
Doubt is fled & clouds of reason
Dark disputes & artful teazing.
Folly is an endless maze,
Tangled roots perplex her ways.
How many have fallen there!
They stumble all night over bones of the dead
And feel they know not what but care;
And wish to lead others when they should be led.

== Context and interpretation ==
The poem is not known in any draft or manuscript version. Initially it was a part of the Songs of Innocence and printed as verso to The Little Black Boy; however, in the latest issues it is commonly placed last, forming a connecting link with the Introduction to the Songs of Experience. After 1818, it was moved into Songs of Experience and became a terminal poem of all the collection of the Songs.

Blake speaks here as the Ancient Bard and the Prophet (who also appeared in the Introduction to the Songs of Experience), trying “to reassure the ‘Youth of delight’ that the morning of regeneration is at hand, when the doubts and disputes of mortal life will be dispelled, even though many have fallen on the way.”

The illustration shows the Bard, a gowned bearded old man, playing a large celtic triangular harp to the listening youths and maidens: two children standing in the middle of the group, and six older youths. There are two young females standing to the left who embrace. Two children and a group of three females stand to the right facing the bard. Another female at their feet, facing them, kneels on a grassy ground. The text above is decorated with leaves and vine.

Swinburne was one of the first reviewers of the poem in his Critical essay (1868), speaking about Blake as a voice of the ancient bard, who “summons to judgment the young and single-spirited, that by right of the natural impulse of delight in them they may give sentence against the preachers of convention and assumption”. For him the initial placement of this poem at the end of the Songs of Innocence seems to be quite convincing, because in this case it serves as a natural prelude to the Songs of Experience and its Introduction, where the same bard is acting.

But most scholars point out the duality and ambiguity of the poem. Stanley Gardner, stressing the double character and function of it in the collection of the Songs, notices that “the morning promise to the ‘youth of delight’, and the dispelling of doubt and despair, are accessories to Innocence: but the tone of the lines does not belong to the lightheartedness of true Innocence... Then in the last six lines the poem shifts towards Experience, identifying the ‘folly’ with perplexity among ‘roots’ that recollect ‘the forest of affliction’... and, in the end, a sense of regret is expressed that those who ‘wish to lead others’ are obsessed with selfish care...”

This ‘forest of affliction’ we encounter in the Song of Enitharmon from the poem Vala, or The Four Zoas:

I wake sweet joy in dens of sorrow & I plant a smile
In forests of affliction
And wake the bubbling springs of life in regions of dark death

— Night the Second, lines 371-373 (Page 34, lines 85-87)

However, there is another opinion introduced by E. D. Hirsch, Jr, that the poem “belongs neither to Innocence nor Experience”. He regards The Voice of the Ancient Bard as “Blake's first apocalyptic outburst,” a poem that “harks back to the Ossianic experiments in Poetical Sketches, but the tone is unlike anything in Blake's earlier poetry.” So, this is a poem which anticipates later prophetic works. It is fundamentally different from the poems in the canon of Innocence as well as of Experience. Here Blake addresses “neither child nor an adult, as in other poems, but a ‘youth’”. The new and better world is not a traditional Eden or the pastoral Heaven of the Songs of Innocence, but “a repudiation of all the old traditions”, and its dawn is quite similar to that in A Song of Liberty (1793):

Where the son of fire in his eastern cloud, while the morning plumes her golden breast,
Spurning the clouds written with curses, stamps the stony law to dust, loosing the eternal horses from the dens of night, crying
Empire is no more! And now the lion & wolf shall cease.

— "A Song of Liberty" lines 19-20, from The Marriage of Heaven and Hell

It is a significant fact that the poem is dated by 1789, the year of French Revolution, that “was the occasion for a radical change in Blake’s valuation of actual life”, and the reviewer sees this dawn, though “ambiguous and unspecific”, as a prophecy of “the dawn of an entirely spiritual and inward Jerusalem which prefigures the final, spiritual Eternity that will end time and death forever.”

== Gallery ==
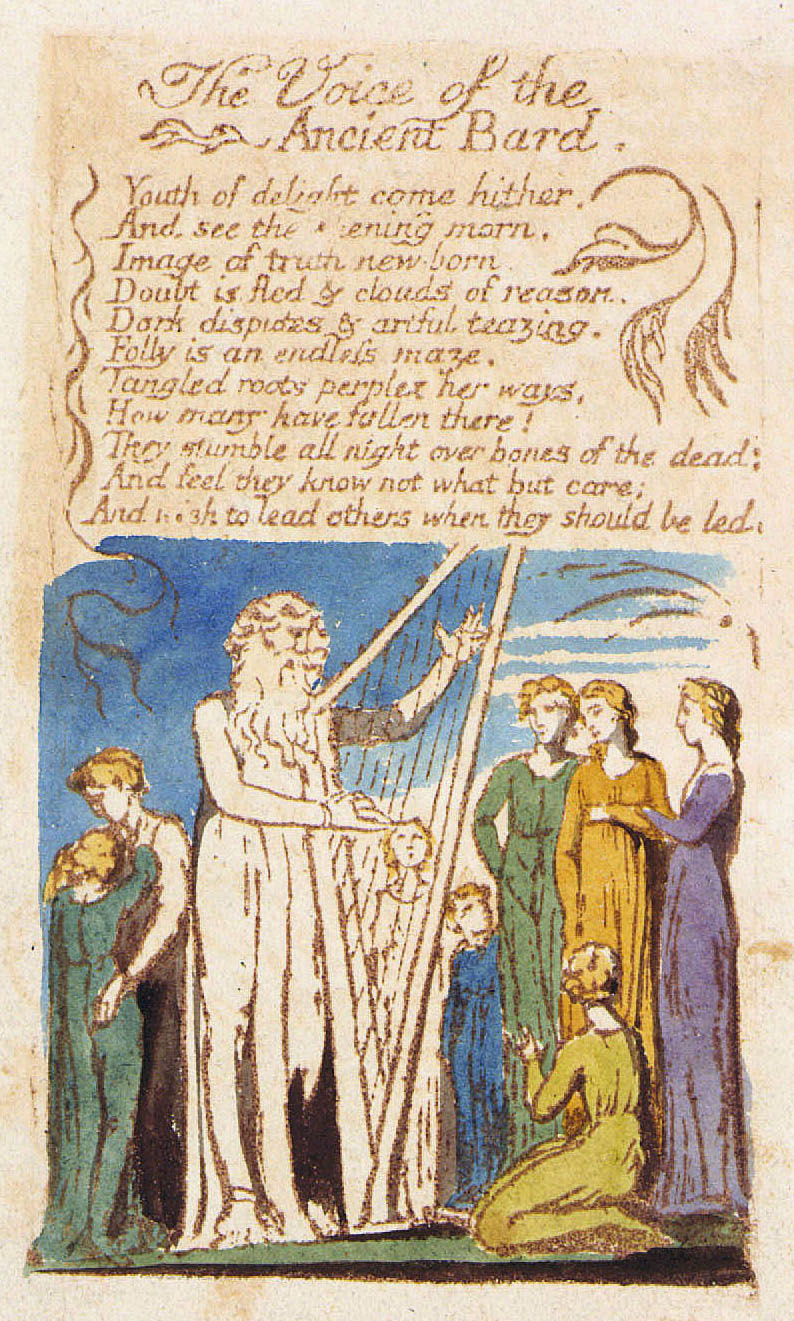
SI, copy B, 1789 (Library of Congress)

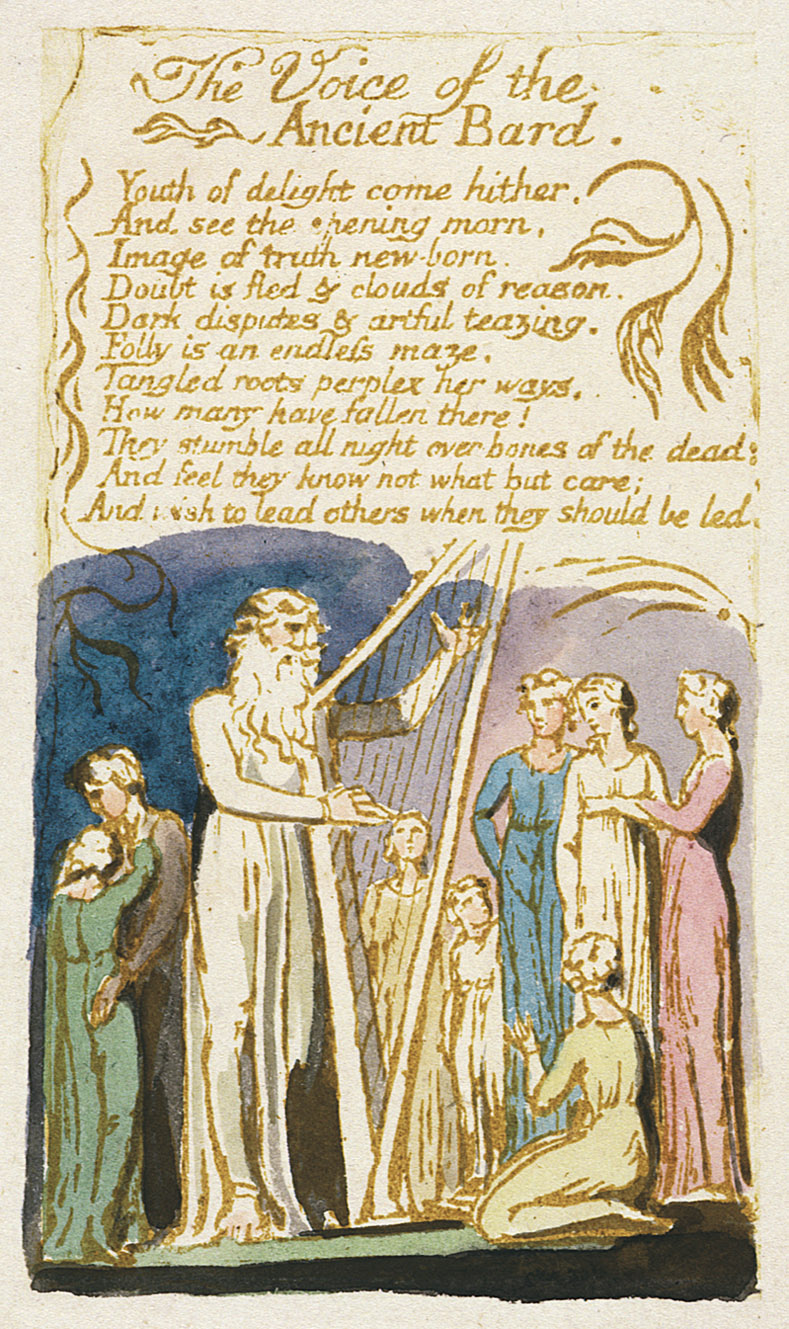
SI, copy G, 1789 (Yale Center for British Art)

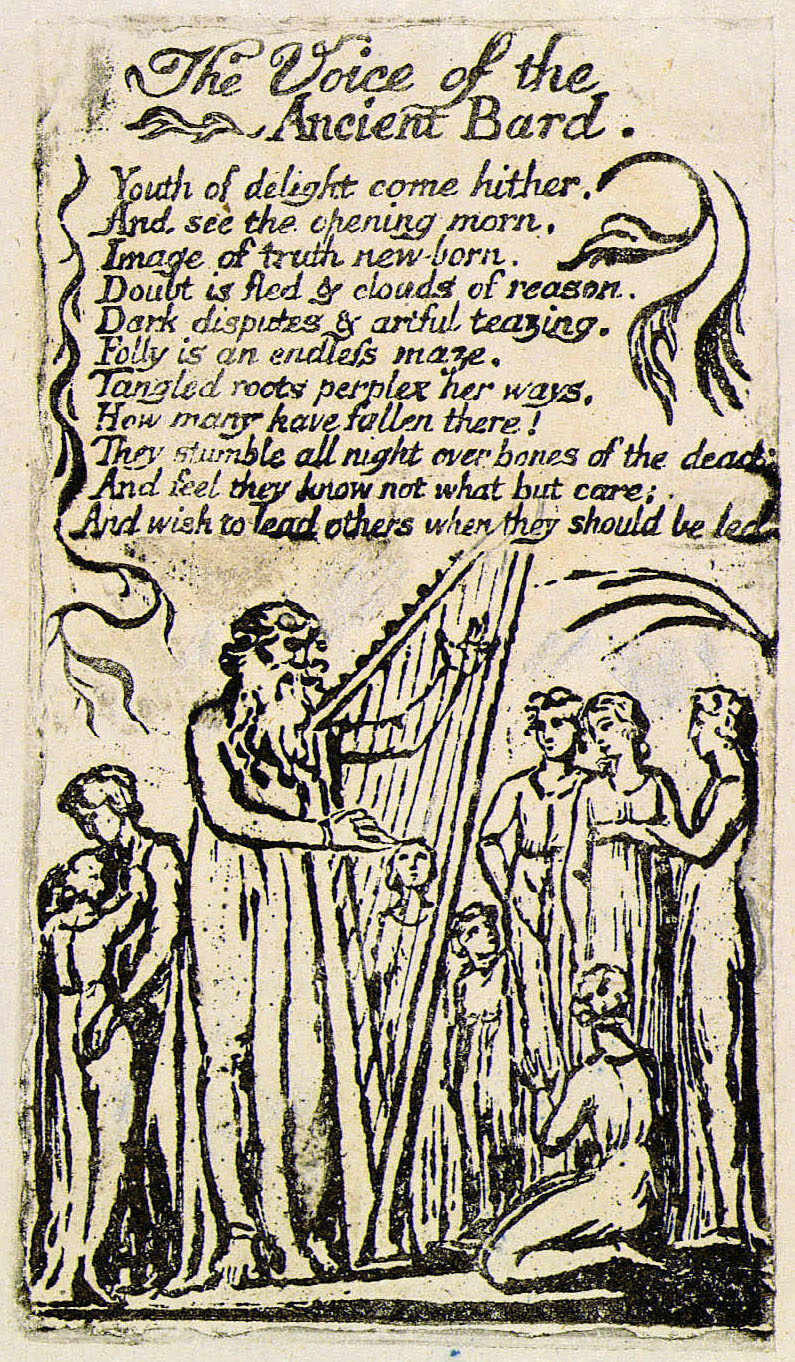
SI, copy U, 1789 (Houghton Library)

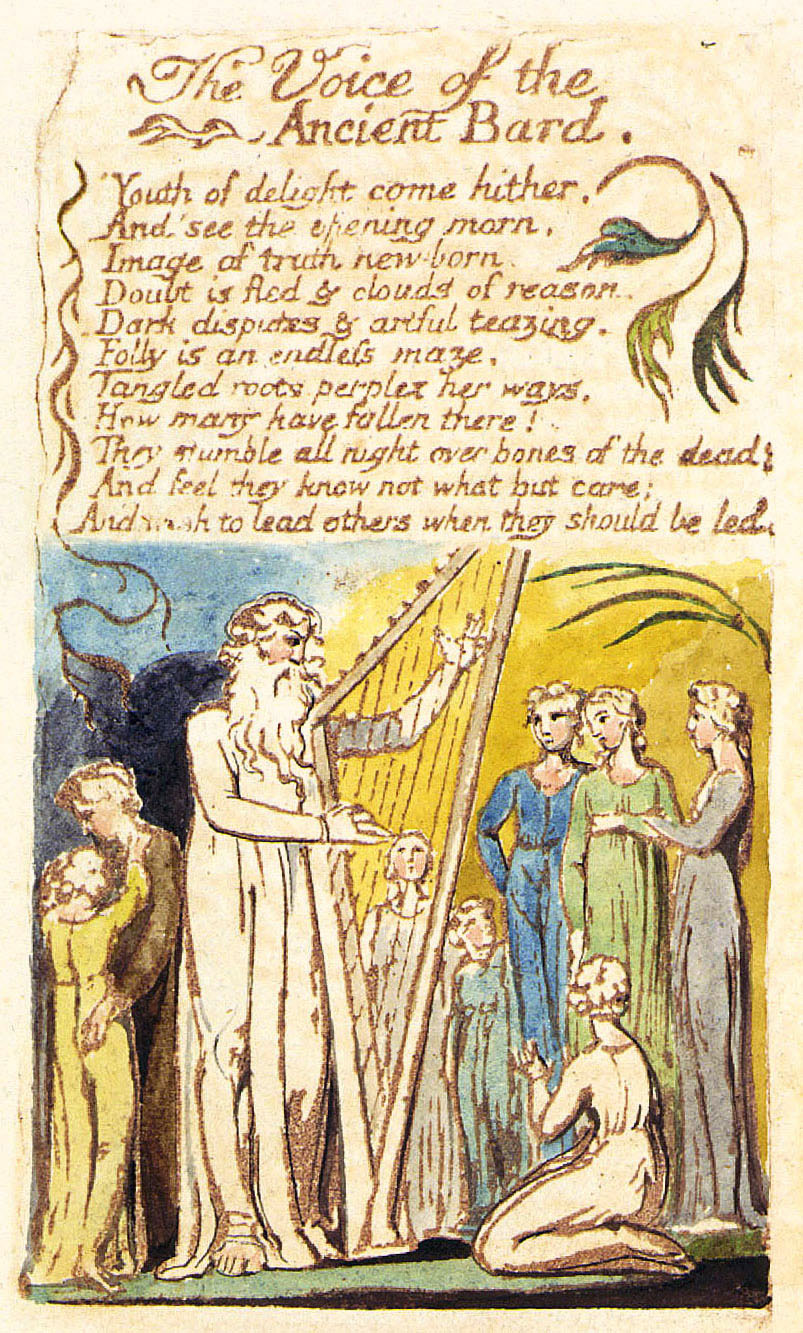
SI&E, copy C, 1789, 1794 (Library of Congress)

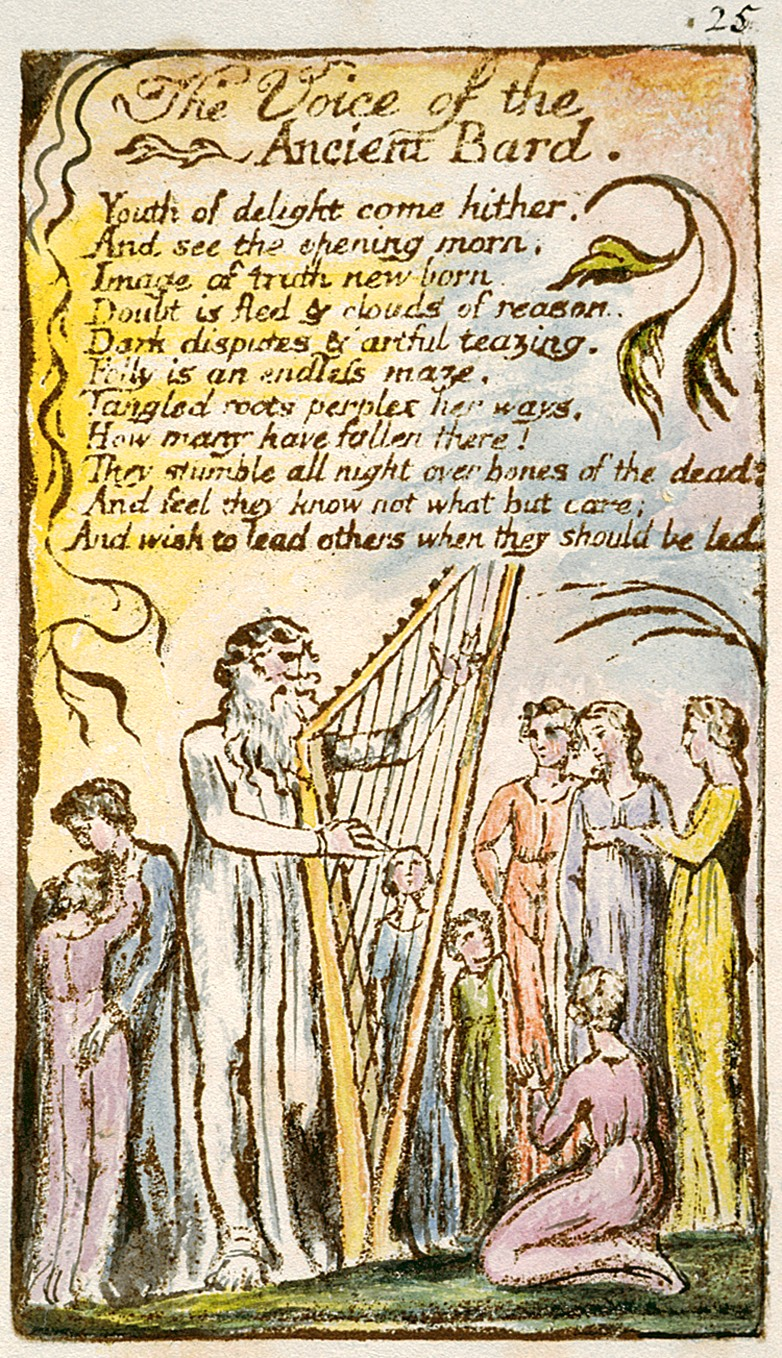
SI&E, copy L, 1795 (Yale Center for British Art)

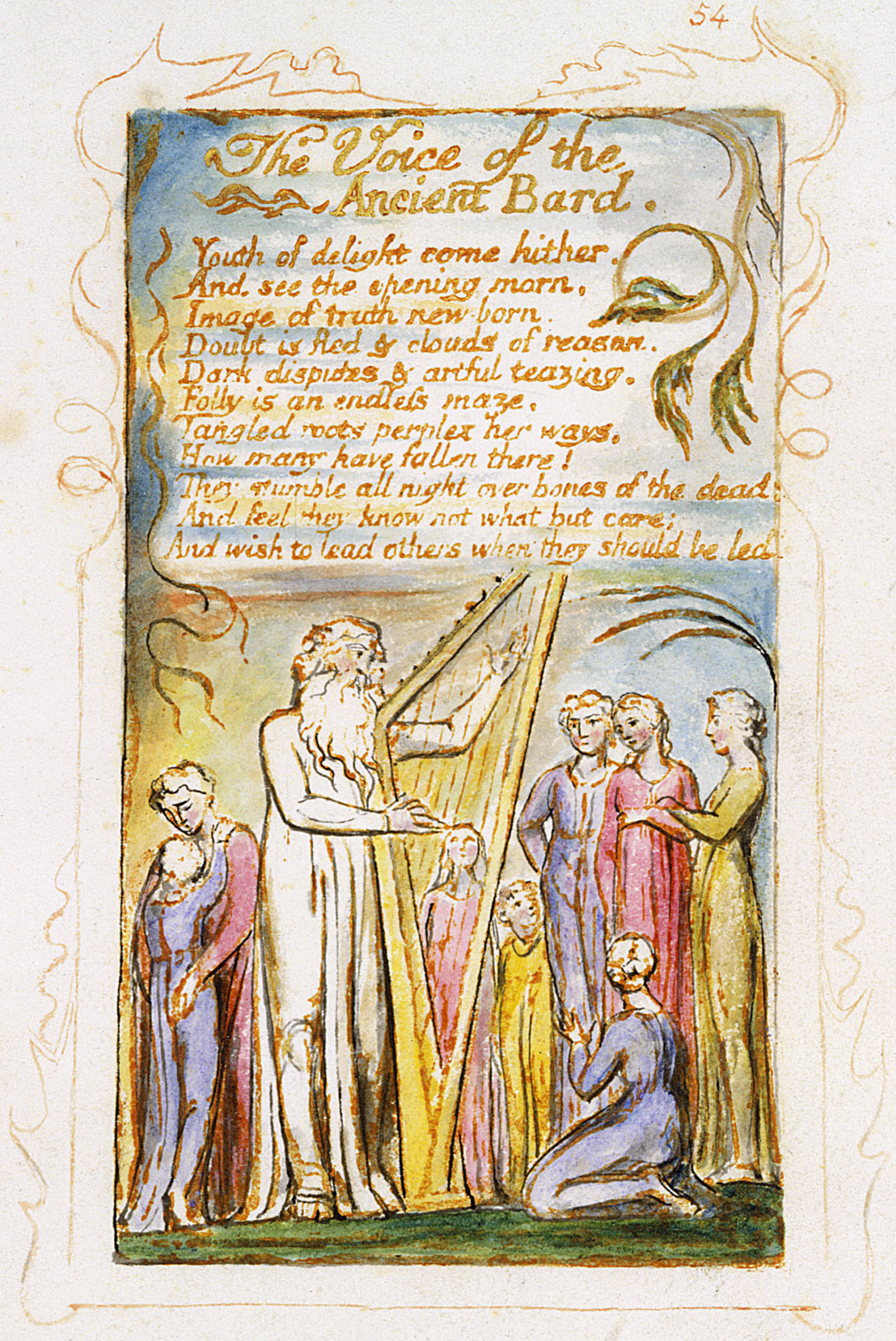
SI&E, copy Y, 1825 (Metropolitan Museum of Art)

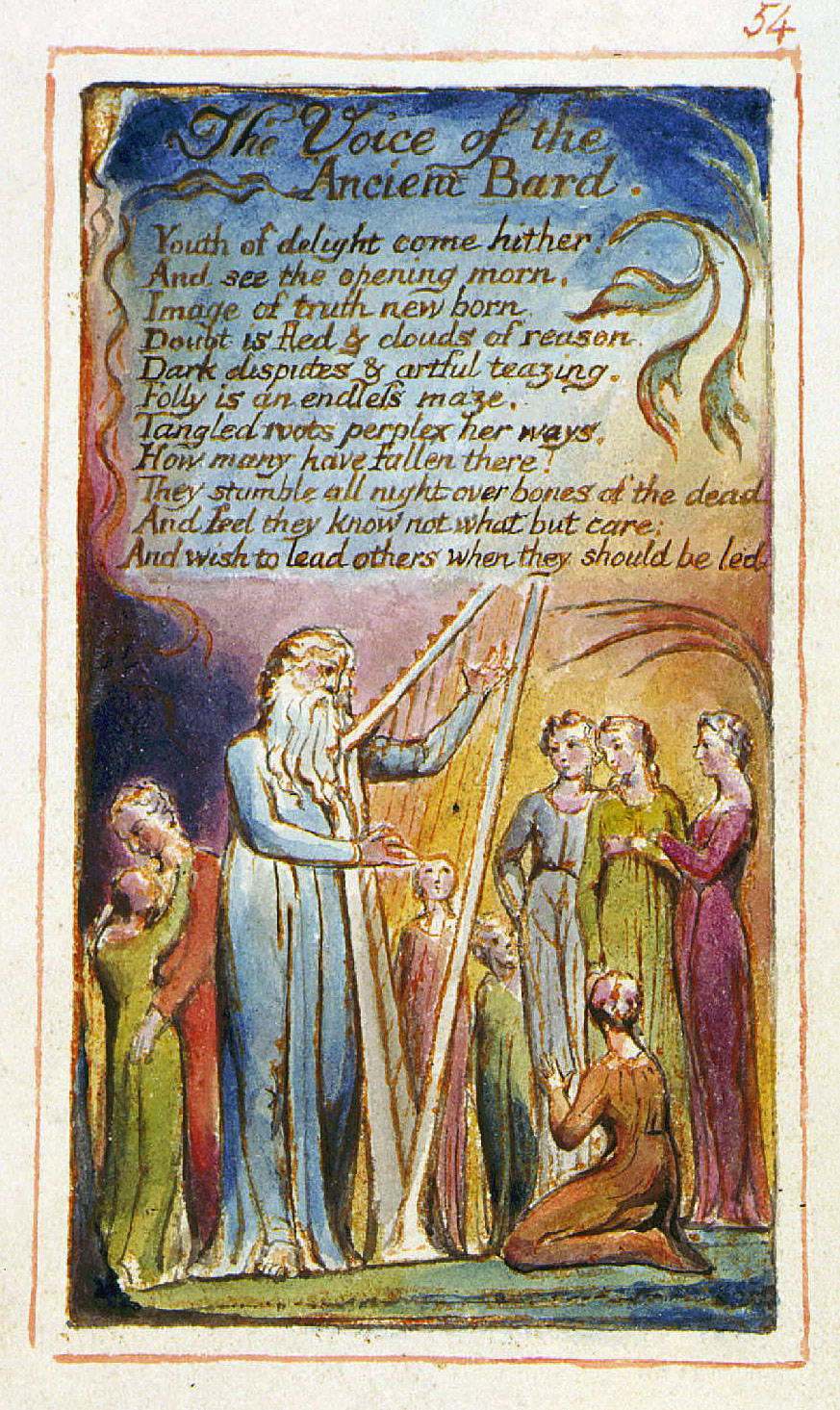
SI&E, copy Z, 1826 (Library of Congress)

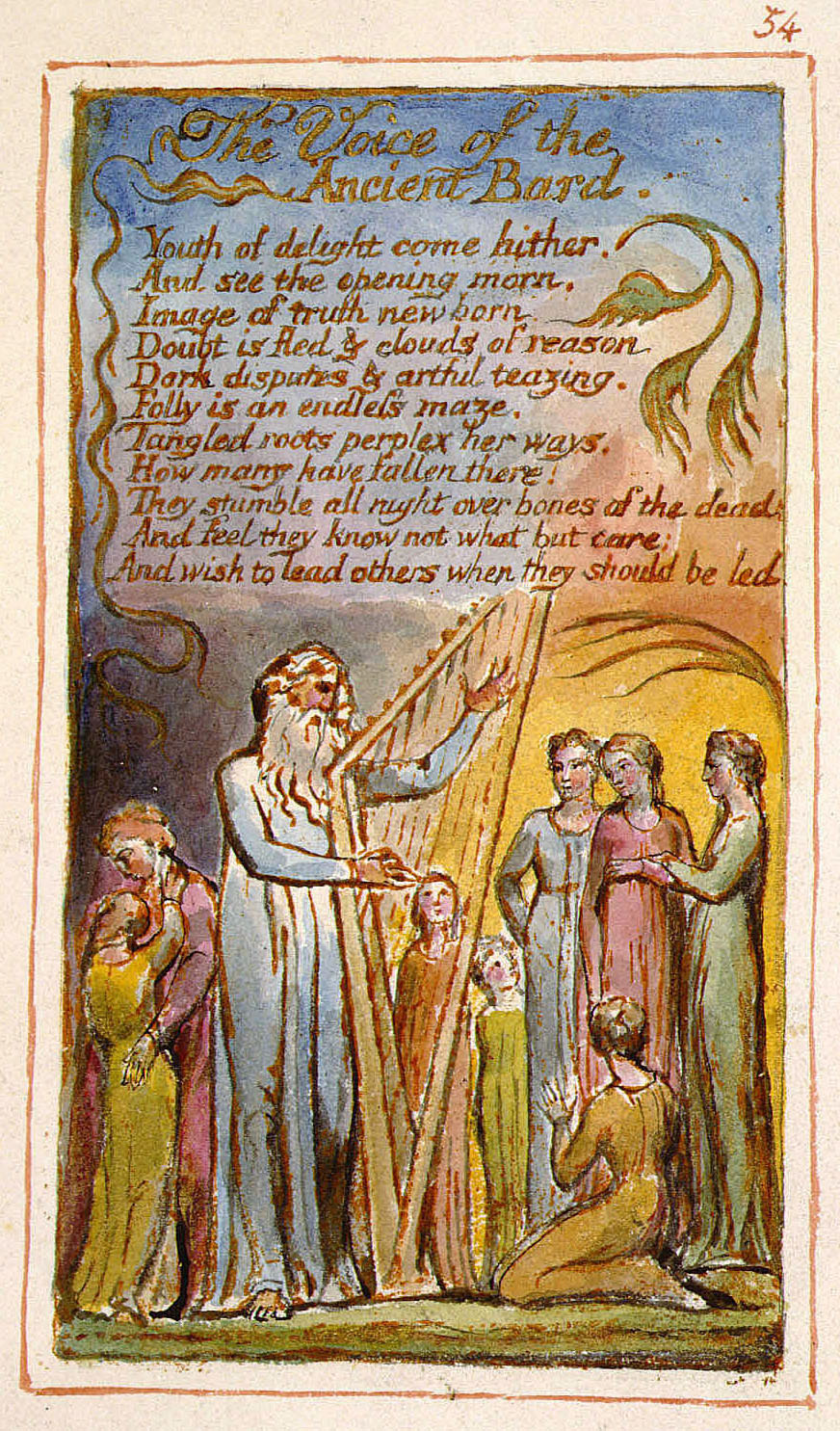
SI&E, copy AA, 1826 (The Fitzwilliam Museum)

== Musical settings ==
The poem has been set to various different musical scores:

- John Harbison (b.1938), USA: The Voice of the Ancient Bard, No. 4 from Five Songs of Experience, for 4 soli, SATB chorus, string quartet and percussions, 1971
- Gary Higginson (b.1952), UK: The Voice of the Ancient Bard, No. 7 from Seven Songs of Experience (set no. 2), for SATB, 1981-2
- Chester Edward Ide (1878—1944), USA: The Voice of the Ancient Bard. No.8 from Songs of Innocence—Eight Poems by William Blake, for two treble voices a capella, 1928.
- Joan Anne Littlejohn (b. 1937), UK: The Voice of the Ancient Bard. No.1 from Songs of Experience (part II of Songs of Innocence and of Experience ), for voice and piano, 1967-70
- Leo Smith (1881–1952), Canada: The Voice of the Ancient Bard, for voice and piano, c. 1900
- Tod Machover (b. 1953), USA: In the opera Skellig, 2008

== Notes ==
=== Works cited ===
- John Sampson (ed.). The poetical works of William Blake; a new and verbatim text from the manuscript engraved and letterpress originals; With variorum readings and bibliographical notes and prefaces. Clarendon Press Oxford 1905. p. 134.
- A. C. Swinburne. William Blake, a critical essay (Chapter: Lyrical poems), 1868.
- Blake Songs of Innocence and of Experience, with an Introduction and Commentary by Geoffrey Keynes. Oxford University Press. 1975. ISBN 0192810898.
- Gardner, Stanley (1986). Blake's Innocence and Experience Retraced. New York: St. Martin's. ISBN 0312083548.
- Hirsch, Jr., E. D. (1964). Innocence and Experience: An Introduction To Blake. New Haven and London: Yale University Press.
- Fitch, Donald (1990). Blake set to music - a bibliography of musical settings of the poems and prose of William Blake. Berkeley, Los Angeles and Oxford: University of California Press. ISBN 0520097343.
