= Romani Studies (journal) =

Academic journal

- Discipline: Romani Studies
- Language: English
- Edited by: Petre Matei

Publication details
- Former name: Journal of the Gypsy Lore Society
- History: 1888–present
- Publisher: Liverpool University Press on behalf of the Gypsy Lore Society
- Frequency: Biannually
- Impact factor: 0.111 (2021)

Standard abbreviations
- ISO 4: Rom. Stud.

Indexing
- ISSN: 1528-0748 (print); 1757-2274 (web)
- LCCN: 00211435
- OCLC no.: 915635387
- Journal of the Gypsy Lore Society
- ISSN: 0017-6087
- LCCN: 09006531
- OCLC no.: 243499096

Links
- Journal homepage

Romani Studies is a biannual peer-reviewed academic journal covering all aspects of Romani studies. It is the official journal of the Gypsy Lore Society. It was established in 1888 and until 1982 was published as the Journal of the Gypsy Lore Society. Its publication resumed in 1991 and in 2000 the journal obtained its current title. The society currently publishes it in association with the Liverpool University Press.

== Abstracting and indexing ==
The journal is abstracted and indexed in:

- Anthropological Literature
- Arts and Humanities Citation Index
- Current Contents/Arts & Humanities
- Current Contents/Social and Behavioral Sciences
- EBSCO databases
- Humanities Abstracts
- International Bibliography of Periodical Literature
- International Bibliography of the Social Sciences
- Linguistic Bibliography
- Modern Language Association Database
- ProQuest databases
- Social Sciences Citation Index

According to the Journal Citation Reports, the journal has a 2021 impact factor of 0.111.

== Editors-in-chief ==
The following persons are or have been editor-in-chief:

- Elena Marushiakova (current)
- Colin Clark (2019–present)
- Daniel Škobla (2019–2020)
- Kimmo Granqvist (2017–2019)
- Yaron Matras (1999–2017)
- Sheila Salo (1990–1999)
