= Leeds University Library's Gypsy, Traveller and Roma Collections =

UoL Library: Gypsy, Traveller and Roma Collections
- Location: The Brotherton Library, Leeds, United Kingdom
- Type: Archives, printed books, printed items, press cuttings, photographs, artworks
- Established: 1950
- Branch of: Cultural Collections, University of Leeds Library

Collection
- Items collected: Printed books, manuscripts from approximately 16th – 21st century
- Size: Over 3,500 print items, multiple manuscript collections
- Criteria for collection: Social history, community history, political history, languages, culture, art

Access and use
- Access requirements: Visit Cultural Collections, Brotherton Library - request items in advance

Other information
- Website: Special Collections: Gypsy, Traveller and Roma Collections

Leeds University Libraries' Gypsy, Traveller and Roma Collections are one of the five Designated collections held by the Brotherton Library at the University of Leeds. The collections contain an extensive range of international books, manuscripts and archives relating to Traveller and Roma culture. The majority of the materials do not originate from within these communities, instead they encapsulate external representations.

The origins of the Collections can be traced back to 1950 when the poet and dramatist, Dorothy Una Ratcliffe, donated her archive material and printed books and pamphlets to Leeds University Library. The Collections have since been augmented by additional donations and purchases.

As of 2020 the printed materials surpassed over 3,500 published works. Archive material includes letters, research papers, press-cuttings, artwork, photographs and case files. The collections date from 16th century to the modern day. The Gypsy, Traveller and Roma Collections are located in Cultural Collections in the Brotherton Library, University of Leeds.

== Designation ==
Acknowledgement of the significance of the Collections came in 2005 when the Gypsy, Traveller and Roma Collections were designated by the Museums, Libraries and Archives Council. The Designation Scheme is a mark of distinction which recognises collections in non-national institutions, which are of outstanding national and international importance for users. The scheme is now administered by the Arts Council England.

The Gypsy, Traveller and Roma Collections are one of five Designated collections in Cultural Collections at Leeds University Library. The library holds five Designated collections.

== History ==
=== Overview ===
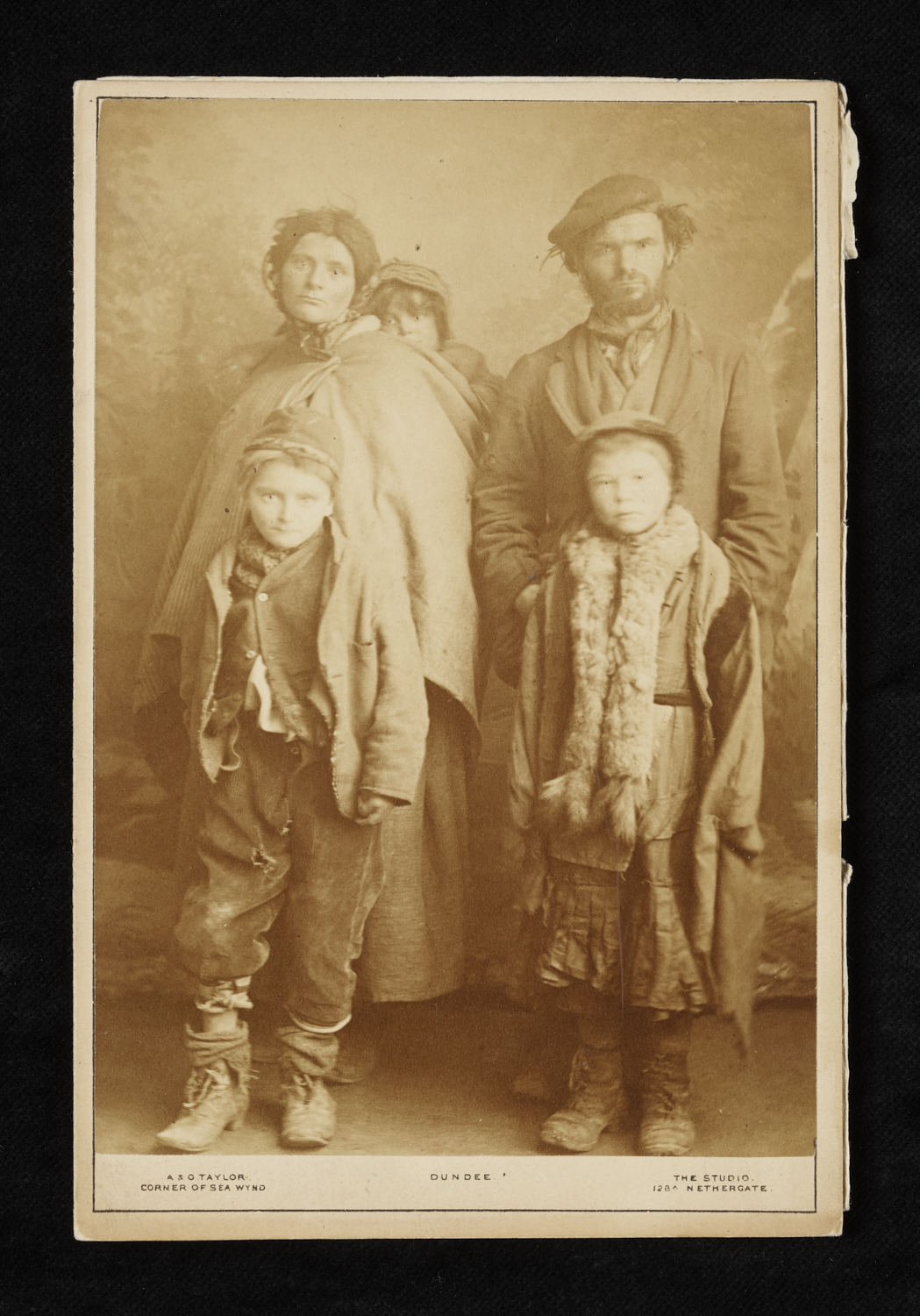
The Cameron family in Dundee, 1883

The Gypsy, Traveller and Roma Collections comprise collections from different sources acquired by the Brotherton Library at various times. These are curated under a single collection group. Each collection is an outsider’s representation of the communities as the collectors were not Travellers or Roma. The collections trace attitudes to, and relationships with, the communities, from the romantic stance of the early twentieth century to the social reality of more modern collections.

The Gypsy, Traveller and Roma Collections relate to communities with a nomadic culture, history or lifestyle. The communities represented include those recognised in UK law as ethnic groups; English and Welsh (Romany) Gypsies, Irish Travellers and Scottish Travellers. They also embrace non-ethnic groups that consider themselves distinct e.g. New Travellers, Showmen and Bargees. ‘Gypsy' may be viewed as offensive outside of the UK, so ‘Roma’ is often the preferred term. Roma represents a number of distinct groups such as Sinti and Manouche.

=== The Romany Collection ===
The Romany Collection was donated by Dorothy Una Ratcliffe in 1950. It includes manuscripts, letters, typescripts, press cuttings, photographs, musical scores, artwork and objects featuring Gypsies and Travellers in the UK and worldwide. Many of the archives relate to the Gypsy Lore Society and its members. The papers reflect the members’ research interests. They include articles published in the Journal of the Gypsy Lore Society.

Ratcliffe left a fund to purchase more material for the collection. Additions include individual items and a series of press cuttings from Durrants Press Cuttings Limited.

The Library bought the following collections in the 1970s with Ratcliffe's fund:

- Donald Kenrick (National Gypsy Council) a linguist, author and activist/scholar.
- T. W. Thompson, headmaster and collector of Gypsy and Traveller folklore, Gypsy Lore Society member.
- Reverend George Hall, Rector of Ruckland, author, Gypsy Lore Society member.
- Robert M. Dawson, author/educationalist.

=== Later donations ===
In 2001 Sir Angus Fraser author and scholar bequeathed his collection to the Library. More recent additions include the collections of the activists Jenny Smith, Bristol area Councillor and Labour Campaigner for Traveller Rights, and Diana Allen, Solicitor and Rights Campaigner.

=== Introductory video ===
In 2017 the Leeds Gypsy and Traveller Exchange (GATE) community collaborated with Cultural Collections to create a short video introduction to the collections.

=== New acquisitions ===
Leeds University Library acquires books and archives to enhance the Gypsy, Traveller and Roma Collections.

== Collections and highlights ==
=== Sir Angus Fraser Collection ===
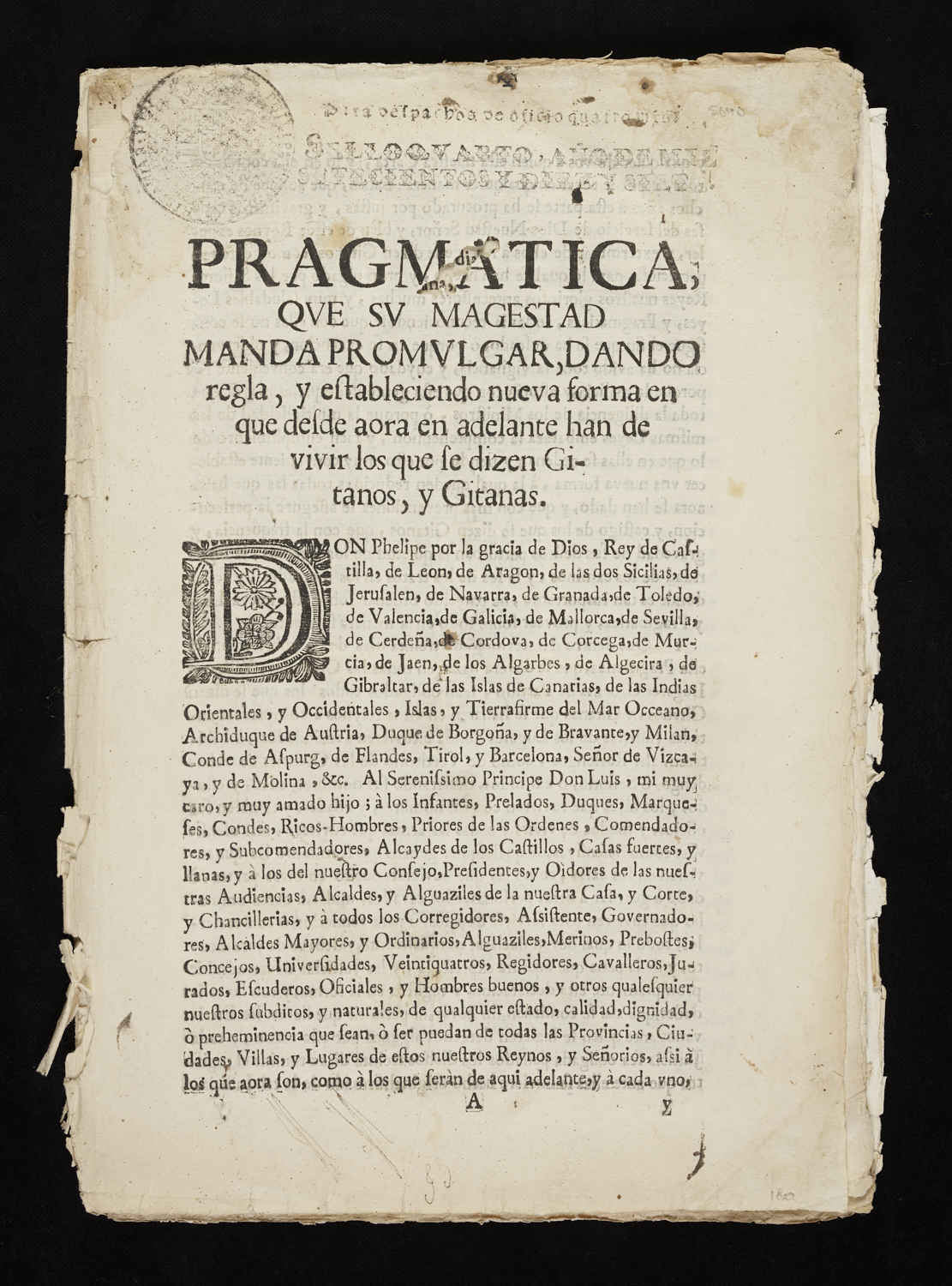
A decree issued by Philip V of Spain regulating the lives of Gypsies in Seville, 1717

The collection was bequeathed in December 2001. It includes personal papers, manuscripts, correspondence, research material and printed works referencing Gypsies, Travellers and Roma in UK and Europe. Many were collected by Sir Angus Fraser in his post of assistant editor of the Gypsy Lore Society. He acquired others while researching his book The Gypsies (The Peoples of Europe) 1995.

The subjects of the papers include national legislation in European countries, history, language/dialects, culture, religion, The Holocaust [Porajmos], Romani studies and the work of the Gypsy Lore Society.

The large amount of official Spanish documents dating from 16th and 17th century which relate to laws applying to "Gitanos" [Roma] in Spain are a highlight of the collections.

=== Jenny Smith Collection ===
The Collection consists of material created and collected by Jenny Smith in the course of her work campaigning on behalf of Gypsies and Travellers in Bristol area and around the UK. It includes papers on UK and European laws and policies and their impact on the lives of Gypsies and Travellers. New (Age) Travellers, that is, non-ethnic Travellers who adopt a nomadic lifestyle feature in particular.

=== Donald Kenrick Collection ===
The focus of the collection is material from the 1960s and 1970s related to the establishment of the Gypsy Council in 1966 and its activities. Donald Kenrick also deposited a considerable number of books and pamphlets about Gypsies, Travellers and Roma.

=== T. W. Thompson Collection ===
Thomas William Thompson (1888–1968) was a prominent collector of Gypsy and Traveller folklore particularly in the North of England and Midlands from 1915. Thompson recorded information from conversations with Gypsies and Travellers in two series of notebooks. The topics include language, customs, biographies and the genealogy of family groups. There is a further collection of Thompson material, the Archive of T. W. Thompson, in the Bodleian Archives & Manuscripts.

=== Robert M. Dawson Collection ===
Robert M. Dawson is a writer and educationalist. He has been president of the Romany & Traveller Family History Society and a former Treasurer of the Derbyshire Gypsy Liaison Group. Dawson champions the heritage and campaigns of Gypsy and Traveller communities. The collection contains press cuttings and card indexes relating to Gypsies and Travellers collected by Dawson. He donated a further collection The Robert Dawson Romany Collection to the Romany & Traveller Family History Society in 1998.

== Research and outreach ==
=== Research topics ===
The Gypsy, Traveller and Roma Collections offer research opportunities in subjects such as art, literature, history, culture, language/linguistics, philology, sociology, religion, law, politics, human rights, activism and geography.

=== Recent research ===
Researchers have used the collections to explore the experiences of the community in different parts of Europe including Spain and in the Austro-Hungarian Empire. Many of the collections have been studied to explore Romani contributions to European culture and the singing traditions of the community. Some researchers have examined the concept of the nomad and nomadic living. The collections have been studied for information about the construction and design of wagons sometimes known as caravans.

=== Publications ===
- Numerous publications in the Journal of the Gypsy Lore Society.
- ‘Mediterranean Gypsies in factsheets in Roma history and culture’, Aresu, Massimo: 2020.
- ‘Gypsy colours’, Le Bas, Delaine: 23 Nov 2016.
- ‘The Romany Collections: 10 etchings of gypsy dances’, Banatvala, Oliver: 2017.

=== In books ===
'The Gypsies; The Peoples of Europe', Angus McKay Fraser, Blackwell, 1995.' McKay used the Romany Collection extensively when researching his book.

Directory of Rare Books and Special Collections in the UK and Republic of Ireland, ed. by. Karen Attar, Facet Publishing, 2016.

=== Exhibitions ===
In 2018 an exhibition 'Rights and Romance' in the Treasures of the Brotherton Gallery at the University of Leeds featured archives from the Gypsy, Traveller and Roma Collections. It was co-curated with Dr Jodie Matthews, a senior lecturer, at the University of Huddersfield. The exhibition included material with historical representations of Gypsies and Travellers by people external to the community, together with contributions from the communities through Leeds Gypsy and Traveller Exchange. The exhibition led to an international seminar entitled 'Why do we need Romani History'.
