= Earth's Answer =

Poem by William Blake

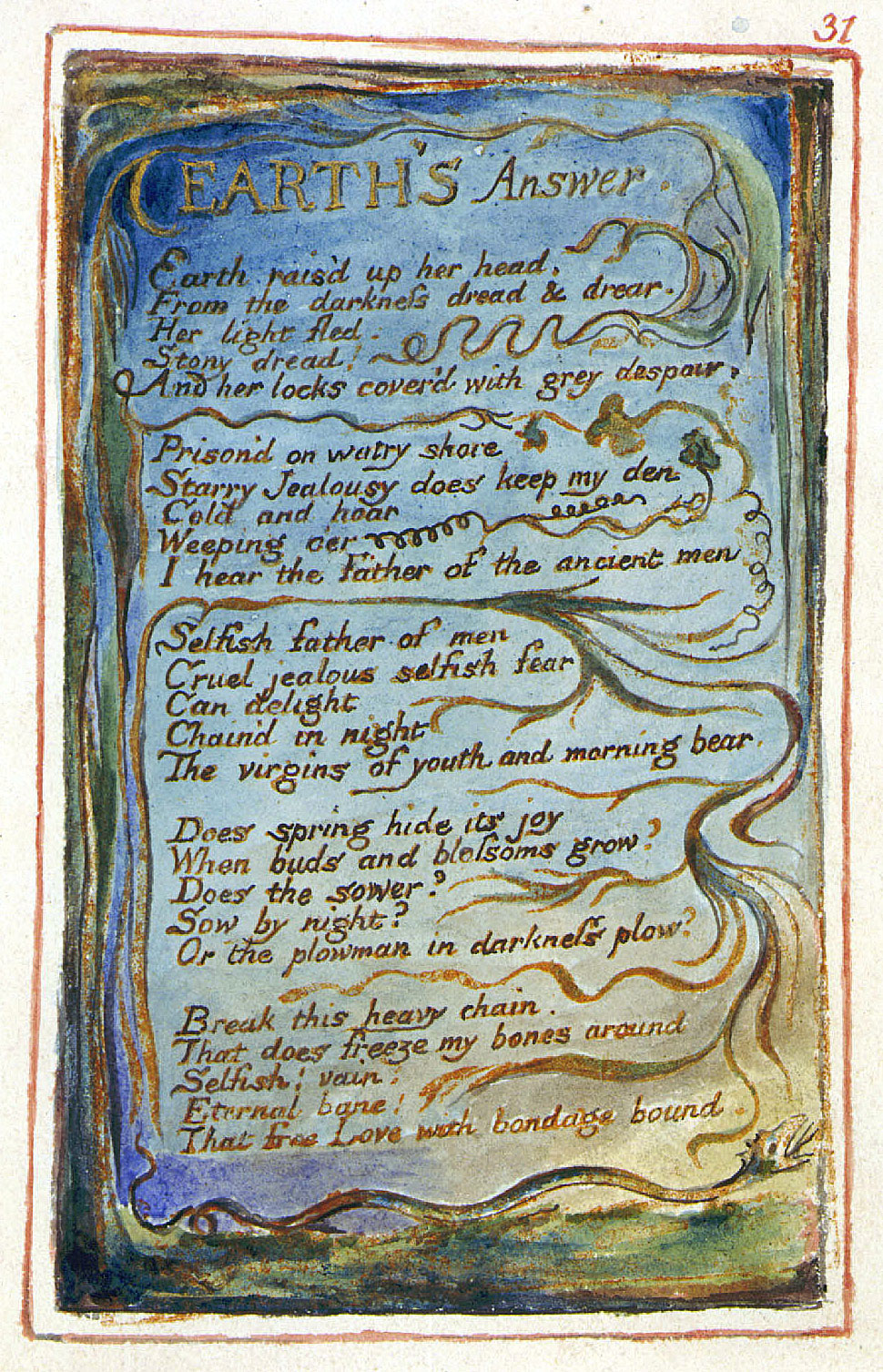
Songs of Innocence and of Experience hand painted copy Z printed in 1826 and currently held by the Library of Congress.

"Earth's Answer" is a poem by William Blake within his larger collection called Songs of Innocence and of Experience (published 1794). It is the response to the previous poem in The Songs of Experience-- Introduction (Blake, 1794). In the Introduction, the bard asks the Earth to wake up and claim ownership. In this poem, the feminine Earth responds.

"Earth's Answer" is composed of five stanzas, each having five lines. With the exceptions of the third and fourth, the stanzas follow an ABAAB rhyme scheme.

== Poem ==
Earth raised up her head
From the darkness dread & drear,
Her light fled,
Stony, dread,
And her locks covered with grey despair.

Prisoned on watery shore,
Starry jealousy does keep my den
Cold and hoar;
Weeping o’er,
I hear the father of the ancient men.

Selfish father of men!
Cruel, jealous, selfish fear!
Can delight,
Chained in night,
The virgins of youth and morning bear.

Does spring hide its joy,
When buds and blossoms grow?
Does the sower
Sow by night,
Or the ploughman in darkness plough?

Break this heavy chain,
That does freeze my bones around!
Selfish, vain,
Eternal bane,
That free love with bondage bound.

== Summary ==
In “Earth’s Answer”, we see that the Earth raises her head from “darkness dread and drear” (2) and that the light about her has fled (3). Her hair is described as being covered with "grey despair" (5). She states that she is imprisoned on the "cold" (8) "watery shore" (6) which is by the “selfish father of men” (11). Earth then gives a series of questions, asking if Spring is budding flowers and if the sower and plowman are working by night (16-20). The final stanza shows Earth asking that the chains be broken and that she be set free (21-25).

== Themes and motifs ==
According to Gleckner, when reading the Songs of Experience, we must keep in mind that this section reflects a "ravening world of the devourer; an adult world of responsibility, decisions, sex, and disease; a dark, confined, dirty, urban world of palpable, not evanescent blackness; a world of wandering and lostness, ale-houses and churches...". This means that the themes will generally be darker than those of the Songs of Innocence.

=== Religion ===
Throughout the Songs of Experience there seems to be an attack on official religion. Since "Earth's Answer" is a response to the "Introduction" to Songs of Experience, it is important to read them in context and in conversation with each other. In the "Introduction", the Bard acts as a prophet in that he is reporting divine speech. The verbal parallels in the Bard's speech reflect Genesis—thus suggesting that the God present in the poems is the God from Old Testament. This signals to the reader that the poet intends to reflect the "traditional view of the Fall as a movement away from happiness, completeness, and Divinity".

Keeping this in mind, as readers transition to "Earth's Answer", it becomes clear that Blake attacks “official religion throughout Songs of Experience” by using the “Christian theme and subduing it completely to his own unorthodox purpose”. In “Earth’s Answer”, Blake "recasts the fall in terms of a malicious God" who keeps Earth imprisoned. Ackland notes that when the Bard admonishes Earth to rise, it seems cruel primarily because "through his failure to intervene... he is responsible for her state". Earth is lowered by man, to the point where she has to raise herself. In terms of religion, this would indicate The Fall. And as Earth is to raise herself up and rebuild herself, the image of a New Eden comes to mind.

=== Nature ===
A typical trope within Romantic poetry is the use of nature to reflect on experiences. The same holds true within this poem through the role of a personified Earth.

Within the fourth stanza ("Does the spring hide its joy..."), Earth relates to nature and humans/human interaction with nature.

Blooming is typical and expected of Spring, and Sowing and Plowing are essential for agricultural practices. Both of these rely heavily on Earth. This shows that Earth represents both humankind and nature. This means that when Earth is wronged by the Father, (who represents God), both Nature and Humankind must suffer the injuries.

== Illustrations ==
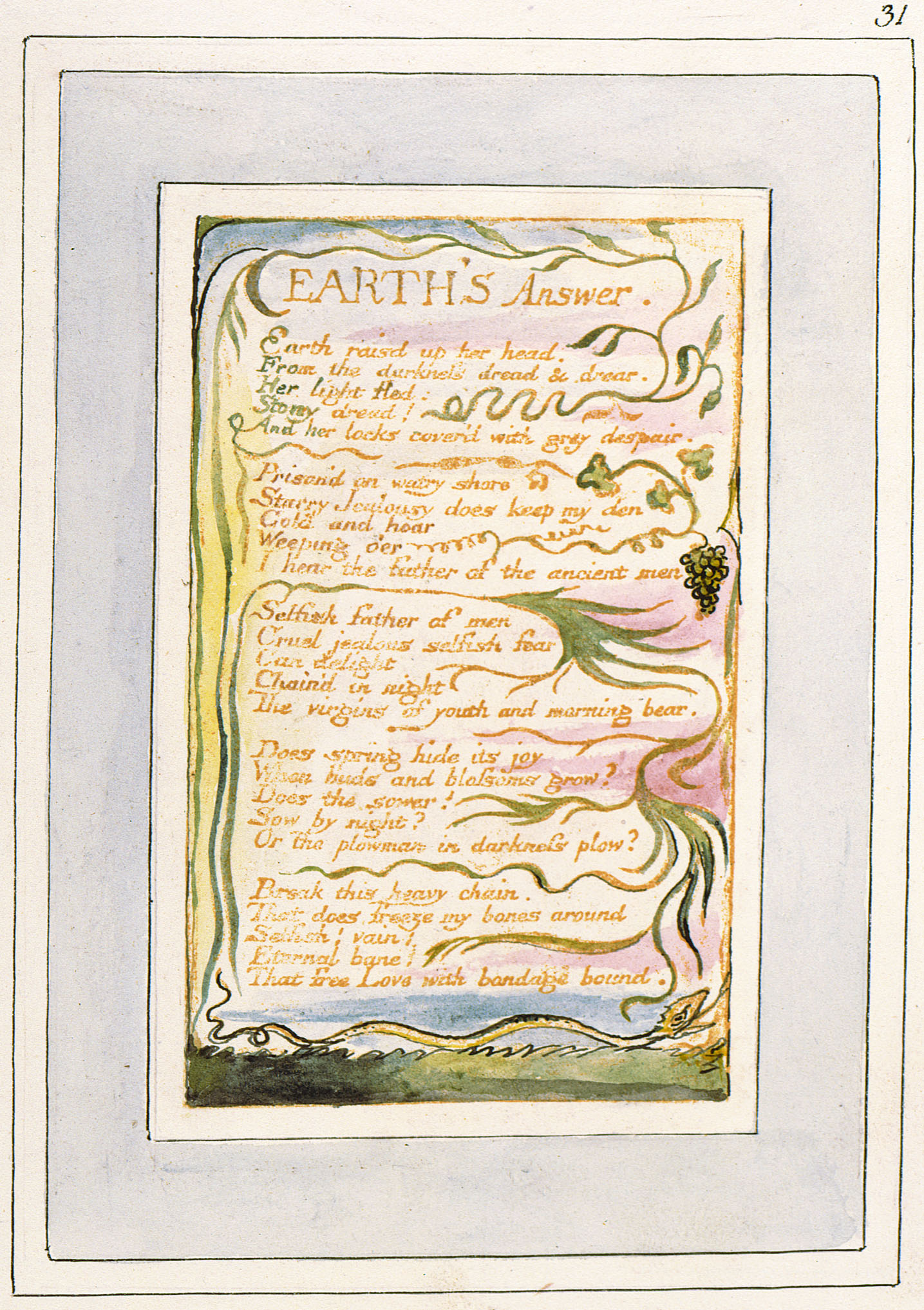
Copy V of "Earth's Answer" printed and hand-painted by Blake in 1821. This version currently resides in the Morgan Library and Museum.

For Songs of Innocence and Experience, Blake used a method called illuminated printing, in which he had complete control over both his poems and the illustrations. The Norton textbook states that when it comes to reading this illuminated manuscript:

"To read a Blake poem without the pictures is to miss something important: Blake places words and images in a relationship that is sometimes mutually enlightening and sometimes turbulent, and that relationship is an aspect of the poem's argument.

The illustration itself contributes and adds to the nature theme. There is a vine-like vegetation that both frames the poem and divides the stanzas. Along the left margin, the vines are straight and vertical. On the right, the vines become thick, leaves, flowers, or even grape-like. Many of the letters are mixed with the vines and nature (Such as "And" in line 5, "of" in Line 9) or emulate the vine-like vegetation ("Youth" in line 15, "heavy" in line 21).

The William Blake Archive analyzes the snake along the bottom of the page:

"Across the bottom an open-mouthed serpent crawls to the right across the grass. The text appears over a large expanse of sky that is dark at top and bottom left but light around the serpent's head at bottom right, as if to suggest sunrise or sunset."

== Critical reception ==
When scholars analyze poetry from the Romantic period, many do it from the lens of Ecocriticism. This has had both positive reactions and negative reactions. In his article "Blake's Deep Ecology", Lussier states that the negative reaction has been centered around scholars fearing of analyzing a poem in an anachronistic fashion by applying "a contemporary political view to past poets and their poetry." However, the interdisciplinary approach of ecological criticism is also vital, as it "directly responds to a physical crisis in which all are implicated and requires us to rethink our intellectual enterprises and institutions."
