= Melin-y-Wig =

Village in Denbighshire, Wales

- Village
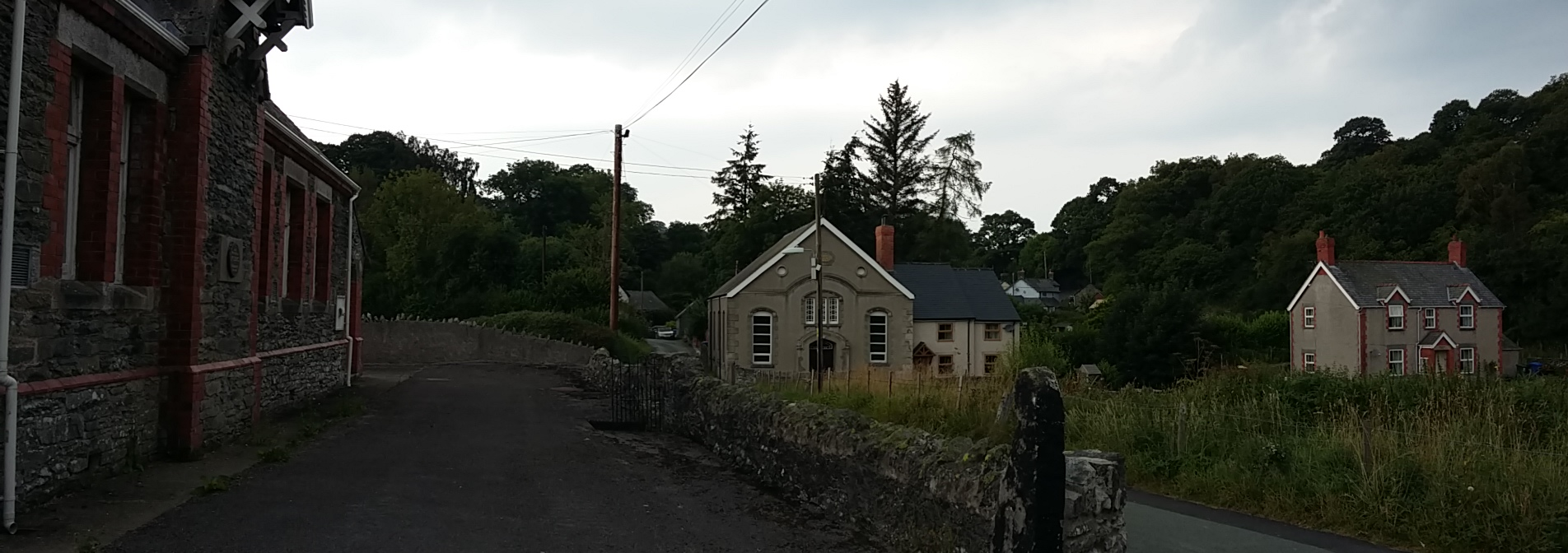
- Melin y Wig village, North Wales

- Location within Denbighshire
- Principal area: Denbighshire
- Country: Wales
- Sovereign state: United Kingdom
- Police: North Wales
- Fire: North Wales
- Ambulance: Welsh

Melin-y-Wig is a village in Denbighshire, Wales. The name which means 'mill in the wood/grove' consists of the Welsh words melin, 'mill', and gwig, 'wood' or 'grove' (soft mutation wig).

== Nursery rhyme ==
Melin-y-Wig is noted for a Welsh nursery rhyme about it:

Bachgen bach o Felin-y-wig,
welodd o 'rioed damaid o gig;
Gwelodd falwen ar y bwrdd,
cipiodd ei gap a rhedodd i ffwrdd.

This translates as:

A little boy from Melin-y-wig, he never saw a morsel of meat; He saw a snail on the table, he snatched his hat and ran away

== The Afon Clwyd and the village bridge ==
The village is situated on the Afon Clwyd. Rising in the nearby Clocaenog Forest (grid reference SJ045535), approximately 8 km northwest of Corwen, the river flows due south up to Melin-y-Wig, when it suddenly changes direction north-eastwards:

After flowing in a generally southerly direction from Waen Ganol to Melin-y-Wig, the river turns abruptly eastwards to flow through a deep, narrow gorge north of Moel Clegyr, swings north and northeast round Dinas and then continues on a course somewhat north of east below Derwen ...

The bridge over the Afon Clwyd lies in the middle of the village, opposite the mill. It was probably first built in the 16th century and according to a document held by North East Wales Archives (NEWA), dated July 1706

the Bridge called Pont Melin y Weeg lying and being in the said county of Denbigh to be out of repair and ought to be repaired by the Inhabitants of the said County.

In 1708 a further NEWA document refers to

the Bridge called Pont Melin y Wig the one end being in the Parish of Derwen in the County of Denbigh and the other End in the parish of Gwyddelwern in the County of merioneth and on the River Cloyd

and that it should be

utterly demolised and thrown down as very Dangerous for her majesties Subjects to travell theron.

'Her majesty' was Queen Anne.

== Buildings ==
One of the oldest buildings is Cynfal Mill, which is probably 17th century. There is a datestone inscribed with the date 1692. In a report by Cadw in 1966 the mill is described as a "picturesque group of three buildings now linked, consisting of the mill itself to the north, of two storeys." Another central village house, Glascoed, has a datestone inscribed 1659. There have also been recent (2026) finds in a village garden of mid to late 17th century clay pipe parts with maker's marks from Shropshire, confirmed by the National Pipe Archive

The village once had its own school, but in the mid-1960s, it was decided to close it in favour of the primary school in Betws Gwerfil Goch. The last headteacher was Mr Oswyn Williams. The school building is now used as a community centre.

== The Iron Age fort - Dinas Melin-y-Wig ==
Dinas Melin-y-Wig (53.0313°N 3.4191°W) is the remains of an Iron Age hillfort, dated about c. 800 BC – AD 74. The monument has helped understanding of later prehistoric defensive organisation and settlement. The fort can be accessed via a footpath and ascended with permission of the owners of Clegyr Mawr, now Eyarth Stud.

== Well-known people from Melin-y-Wig ==
John Edward Jones (1905-1970), a founder member of Plaid Cymru, was born in the village. He became secretary and organiser of the party and stood for election in Caernarfon in 1950.
