= Acorn Bank Garden & Watermill =

National Trust property near Penrith, England

Coordinates: 54.6470°N 2.5934°W

Acorn Bank Garden & Watermill is a National Trust property situated just north of Temple Sowerby, near Penrith, Cumbria, England.

The garden features over 250 medicinal and culinary herbs and is protected by ancient oaks and high walls. There are orchards with old varieties of English fruit. The estate includes a partially restored functioning watermill, powered from the Crowdundle Beck.

It was left to the trust in 1950 by Dorothy Una Ratcliffe, a popular author in the Yorkshire dialect, who bought and restored the house and garden. The house was known for some time as Temple Sowerby Manor before the National Trust reverted to its original name of Acorn Bank in 1969.
