= Betws Gwerfil Goch =

Village in Denbighshire, Wales

Betws Gwerfil Goch: Welsh: Betws Gwerful Goch
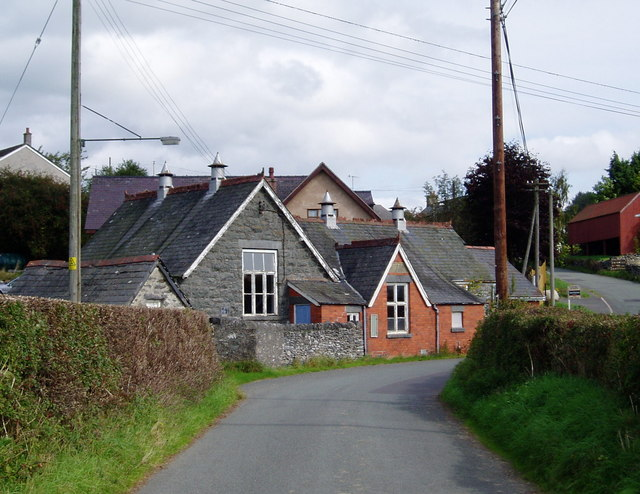
- The Old School

- Location within Denbighshire
- Population: 351 (2011)
- OS grid reference: SJ033465
- Community: Betws Gwerfil Goch
- Principal area: Denbighshire
- Preserved county: Clwyd
- Country: Wales
- Sovereign state: United Kingdom
- Post town: CORWEN
- Postcode district: LL21
- Dialling code: 01490
- Police: North Wales
- Fire: North Wales
- Ambulance: Welsh
- UK Parliament: Bangor Aberconwy
- Senedd Cymru – Welsh Parliament: Clwyd West
- List of places UK Wales Denbighshire 53.008°N 3.443°W Map of the community

Betws Gwerfil Goch (Standard Welsh: Betws Gwerful Goch) is a village and community in Denbighshire, Wales. It had a population of 351 at the 2011 census. Until 1974 it was part of Edeirnion Rural District in Meirionnydd, and was transferred to Glyndŵr District in Clwyd by the Local Government Act 1972. It became part of Denbighshire again in 1996. The community includes Melin-y-Wig village.

The village retains its primary school.

== Notable people ==
- John Edward Jones (Welsh politician)
- John Sampson (linguist)
