= Yaron Matras =

British linguist (born 1963)

Yaron Matras (Hebrew: ירון מטרס; born 24 October 1963) is a linguist specializing in Romani, Kurdish, and other languages of the Middle East. He is one of the most prominent English-language Romani linguists and the author of several pioneering studies, including a book on Romani: A Linguistic Introduction (Cambridge University Press, 2002) and on Romani in Britain: The afterlife of a language (Edinburgh University Press, 2010), and A Grammar of Domari (De Gruyter Mouton, 2012). Matras organized the First International Conference on Romani Linguistics in 1993, and has served as Editor of the cross-disciplinary journal Romani Studies since 1999. In his previous role at the University of Manchester, he coordinated the Romani Project and in 2010 he launched the Multilingual Manchester project. His publications include a book on Language Contact (Cambridge University Press, 2009) and a co-edited trilogy on Mixed Languages, Linguistic Areas, and Grammatical Borrowing.

In 2012 Yaron Matras was awarded the Senior Fellowship of the Zukunftskolleg at the University of Konstanz.

== Notable works ==
Matras wrote I Met Lucky People: The Story of the Romani Gypsies, published in 2014. The book provides an overview of Romani history and culture, intended for a general readership. Writing in The Observer, journalist Peter Stanford wrote that "Matras's immaculately researched, warm and comprehensive study is a challenge belatedly to make a start [of understanding the Romani]." Linguist Victor Friedman praised the book for its scholarship while being able to be read by both an academic and general audience, also writing that the book "...fills an important gap in the literature on the Romani people." Historian Eve Rosenhaft complimented the book's "lively style, colourful anecdote and measured and conscientious approach to presenting and assessing evidence" and recommended it to "both scholarly and popular readerships, and this is important because it is meant to find a wide audience and deserves to do so."

In 2015, The Romani Gypsies was published by Harvard University Press. The book contains the same text as I Met Lucky People but with an expanded bibliography, footnotes, revised index, and additional text on Romani identity.

== Bibliography ==
- Romani: A Linguistic Introduction. Cambridge University Press, 2002. ISBN 9781139433242.
- Romani in Britain: The Afterlife of a Language. Edinburgh University Press, 2010. ISBN 9780748643691.
- A Grammar of Domari. Walter de Gruyter, 2012. ISBN 9783110291421.
- I Met Lucky People: The Story of the Romani Gypsies. Penguin Books, 2014. ISBN 9780241954706.
- The Romani Gypsies. Harvard University Press, 2015. ISBN 9780674368385.
- Language Contact. Cambridge University Press, second edition. 2020. ISBN 9781108425117.
