= John Sampson (linguist) =

Irish linguist, literary scholar and librarian

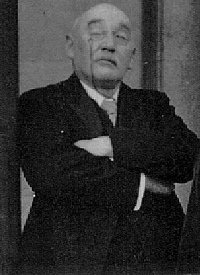
John Sampson

John Sampson (1862–1931) was an Irish linguist, literary scholar and librarian. As a scholar he is best known for The Dialect of the Gypsies of Wales (1926), an authoritative grammar of the Welsh Romani language.

== Early life ==
He was born in Schull, County Cork, Ireland, the son of James Sampson (1813-c. 1871), a chemist and engineer, and his wife Sarah Anne Macdermott; he was brother to Ralph Allen Sampson (1866-1939). James Sampson left Ireland after losing all his money in a bank failure. The family with four sons moved to Liverpool in 1871. John Sampson, the eldest, left school at the age of 14, after his father's death, and was apprenticed to the engraver and lithographer Alexander MacGregor. MacGregor retired when Sampson was aged 22, and from 1888 he ran his own printing business, in Liverpool's Corn Exchange.

Sampson became librarian at University College, Liverpool in 1892, largely self-taught. His printing business had failed that year, and his application was supported by Kuno Meyer.

In 1894, on a camping trip with others from the College, he encountered the musician Edward Wood, near Bala. The Wood family to which he belonged, descendants of Abram Wood (died 1799), were noted as speakers of Welsh-Romani, a quite pure inflected Romani dialect, which was to become Sampson's major study, and which earned him the sobriquet Romano rai ("Romany Lord", Gypsy scholar), or just "the Rai". They were also musicians, twenty-six harpists being noted from the 18th century. In 1896, through Lloyd Roberts, a harpist and Edward Wood's brother-in-law, Sampson found Matthew Wood, on Cader Idris, who moved shortly to Abergynolwyn. He was brother to Edward, and with his four sons more fluent in Welsh Romani, in which they told folk tales. Sampson spent vacations with them, and began a thirty-year lexicographical and philological project on the language. Matthew Wood, however, abruptly disappeared some three years later.

In 1901 Sampson met the artist Augustus John, who was teaching in an art school connected with University College. They struck up a long friendship, leading to an emphasis in John's works on Romani subjects. At this period Sampson also knew the Polish painter Albert Lipczyński, who was in Liverpool with an introduction to John; Sampson found him an interpreter, "Doonie", who became his wife.

== Researcher with assistants ==
In the work of compiling The Dialect of the Gypsies of Wales, Sampson had assistants, notably Dora Esther Yates, who resisted his advances but found him intriguing. Other followers were Gladys Imlach, Eileen Lyster and Agnes Marston. Yates was in revolt against a strict family background, and recalled as comic the occasion when she and Marston were sent in 1906 to research the language of some German Roma in Blackpool. They returned late to family homes, both to find they had been locked out.

Yates and Marston were sent in 1907 to find the burial place of Abram Wood, which they did, at Llangelynnin; Lyster later confirmed it, with a 1799 register entry. Yates and Marston were also successful in tracking down Matthew Wood, Sampson's important Welsh Romani source who had then been out of contact for nine years, at Betws Gwerfil Goch in 1908.

== Later life, death and funeral ==
Sampson separated from his wife Margaret in 1920. In the intermittent history of the Gypsy Lore Society, Dora Yates supported its revival in 1922 (the Society had ceased to function during World War I, after Robert Andrew Scott Macfie had set it up again around 1906 and Sampson's presidency of 1915), and became its secretary in 1932.

Sampson retired as librarian in 1928, and died at West Kirby, Cheshire on 9 November 1931. His funeral was non-religious with Romani elements, and his ashes were scattered on Foel-goch.

Macfie and Yates were Sampson's executors, with Yates becoming the keeper of his literary estate. It was Yates who organised Sampson's funeral that took place on 21 November 1931 at Llangwm, west of Corwen and north of Bala. At Margaret Sampson's request, women (other than Yates) were excluded. Augustus John was there, Michael Sampson for the immediate family, and Roma including Ithal Lee and musicians. The event had extensive national newspaper coverage.

== Scholar ==
While still a printer, Sampson investigated Shelta, a language used in the United Kingdom and United States with Irish origins. His work in this area was eventually published in 1937, by R. A. Stewart Macalister. An early work on the Roma was "English Gypsy Songs and Rhymes", containing eighteen Anglo-Romani pieces. It was published in 1891, in the Journal of the Gypsy Lore Society.

Sampson edited a collection of the poetry of William Blake, Blake's "Poetical Works" (1905), that restored the text from original works and annotated the published variants; Alfred Kazin described this as "the first accurate and completely trustworthy edition". The 1913 edition published for the first time Blake's poem The French Revolution. As a reviser, Sampson was involved in Geoffrey Keynes's 1921 Blake bibliography. They met for the first time in Liverpool, in 1910.

The University of Oxford awarded Sampson an honorary degree in 1909. It was a D.Litt., and recognised both his linguistic studies and his work as a literary scholar.

The Dialect of the Gypsies of Wales (1926) was Sampson's major work. It was started with the collaboration of Edward Wood, who died in 1902.

== Family ==
Sampson married in 1894 (Jessie) Margaret Sprunt (1871–1947). The match was against the wishes of her father David Sprunt, and took place in secret at the Church of St Luke, Liverpool. They had two sons, Michael, and Amyas, who was killed fighting in World War I, and a daughter Honor. Sampson also had a daughter with his research assistant Gladys Imlach (d. 1931). From about 1909 he led a double life, with Margaret, Amyas, and Honor living in a cottage rented at Betws Gwerfil Goch in north Wales, and with Gladys, a relationship that was covert in his lifetime.

Michael Sampson was the father of the writer Anthony Sampson, who published a biography of John Sampson, The Scholar Gypsy: The Quest For A Family Secret (1997).
