= Gypsy Lore Society =

Historical and cultural society, established 1888

The Gypsy Lore Society is an English-language ethnographic society dedicated to the history and lore of "Gypsies", meaning Romani people and other Travellers. It was founded in Great Britain in 1888 to establish closer contacts among scholars studying aspects of such cultures.

== History ==
The society was co-founded in 1888 by Charles G. Leland, David MacRitchie and several other folklore scholars. Leland served as its first president. From 1892, the organisation was dormant until its revival in 1907, when MacRitchie was elected president.

Another early member of the society was the explorer Sir Richard Burton, who wrote from Trieste in 1888:

We [The Gypsy Lore Society] must advance slowly and depend for success upon our work pleasing the public. Of course, all of us must do our best to secure new members, and by Christmas I hope that we shall find ourselves on the right road. Mr. Pincherle writes to me hopefully about his practical studies of Gypsy life in Trieste. As regards Orientalism in England generally I simply despair of it. Every year the study is more wanted and we do less. It is the same with anthropology, so cultivated in France, so stolidly neglected in England. I am perfectly ashamed of our wretched "Institution" in Hanover Square when compared with the palace in Paris. However, this must come to an end some day.

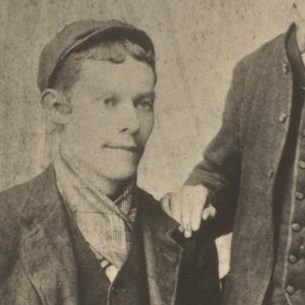
1899 photo of R. A. Scott Macfie

The Society had ceased to function during World War I. Robert Andrew Scott Macfie had set it up again round 1906 and John Sampson was its president of 1915. The Romani scholar Dora Esther Yates supported the society's revival in 1922 and she became its de facto secretary although this did not happen formally until 1932.

Since 1989 it has been headquartered in the United States. Its goals include promotion of the study of Roma, Gypsies and Travellers. The Gypsy Lore Society publishes the biannual journal Romani Studies which is concerned with disseminating accurate information aimed at increasing understanding of these cultures in their diverse forms. This is a continuation of the Journal of the Gypsy Lore Society which appeared in four series, starting in July 1888. From 1978 to 2023, the society also published the quarterly Newsletter of the Gypsy Lore Society. The Society's archives are held at the University of Liverpool.

The Gypsy and Traveller cultures represented include those traditionally known as Roma, Sinti, Calé, Romnichels, Ludar, Irish Travellers, Scottish Travellers and others.

The Society also sponsors programmes and conferences. The North American chapter of the Society established the Victor Weybright Archives of Gypsy Studies in 1978, specialising in recent scholarly work on Gypsy, Traveller and related studies. This research collection is now housed at the University of Michigan.

The president of the Gypsy Lore Society from 2012 to 2020 was Elena Marushiakova. From 2020 the president of the Gypsy Lore Society is Tatiana Podolinska.
